= NoSQLz =

- Release: 2014
- Stable release: 2.1.0 / March 2, 2015
- Written in: IBM High Level Assembler
- Operating system: z/OS
- Available in: English
- Type: NoSQL
- Website: web.archive.org/web/20190104030719/http://nosqlz.com/

NoSQLz is a consistent key-value big data store (NoSQL database) for z/OS IBM systems. It was developed by systems programmer Thierry Falissard in 2013. The purpose was to provide a low-cost alternative to all proprietary mainframe DBMS.

NoSQLz is proprietary software. Version 1 is freeware.

== Distinctive features ==
NoSQLz only provides basic create, read, update and delete (CRUD) functions. It is designed to be very straightforward and easy to implement.

ACID properties are provided, so as to have "real transactions", through optimistic concurrency control, timestamp-based concurrency control and multiversion concurrency control (MVCC).

== Interfaces ==
Unlike version 1, version 2 of NoSQLz is chargeable and supports IBM Parallel Sysplex. The NoSQLz DBMS can be interfaced in Rexx, Cobol, IBM High Level Assembler, etc.
