= CO =

CO or variants may refer to:

== Chemistry ==
- Carbon monoxide (CO), a colorless, odorless, and tasteless gas
- Carbonyl group, composed of a carbon atom double-bonded to an oxygen atom: C=O
- Metal carbonyl, carbon monoxide as a ligand to transition metals
- Cobalt, a chemical element, symbol Co.

== Computing and telecommunications ==
- .co (second-level domain), the Internet second-level domain meaning "commercial"
- .co, the Internet country code top-level domain (ccTLD) for Colombia
- Commitment ordering (CO), a concurrency control technique for databases
- Telephone exchange, or central office (CO)

== Mathematics ==
- Cofunction, or Co, in trigonometry
- Cuboctahedron, a uniform polyhedron

== People ==
- Nguyễn Hữu Có (1925–2012), Vietnamese general
- Conrado Co (born 1940), Filipino badminton player
- Alfredo Co (born 1949), Filipino Sinologist
- Co Giling (born 1950), Dutch speed skater
- Atoy Co (born 1951), Filipino actor and basketball coach
- Leonard Co (1953–2010), Filipino botanist
- Marivic Co-Pilar (born 1971), Filipino politician
- Nando Có (born 1973), Bissau-Guinean footballer
- Kenedy Có (born 1998), Bissau-Guinean footballer
- Samuel S. Co, Filipino politician

== Places ==
- CO postcode area, or Colchester postcode area, England
- Colombia, ISO 3166-1 country code CO
- Colorado, US postal abbreviation CO
- Counties of Ireland, abbreviated Co.

== Ranks and titles ==
- C.O., post-nominal initials of members of the congregation of the Oratory of Saint Philip Neri
- C/O, cadet officer ranks of the Junior Reserve Officers' Training Corps
- Commanding officer (CO), the officer in command of a military unit
- Contracting Officer (CO or KO), in the U.S. government
- Correctional officer (CO), an officer whose duty it is to safeguard and promote the welfare of inmates
- Circle officer (CO), in the Indian government
- Conscientious objector

== Transportation ==
- Chemins de fer Orientaux (CO), a former Ottoman railway company
- Chesapeake and Ohio Railway (C&O or CO), a former American railroad
- Cobalt Air (IATA airline designator CO, 2016-2018), a Cypriot airline
- Continental Airlines (IATA airline designator CO, 1937-2012), an American airline

== Other uses ==
- co-, an English prefix meaning coming together
- Cardiac output (CO), the volume of blood being pumped by the heart per time unit
- Castres Olympique, a French rugby club
- Certificate of occupancy (CO), a legal document
- Certificate of origin (often abbreviated to C/O or CoO), in international trade
- Co (Armenian letter)
- Company, abbreviated co.
- Corsican language (ISO 639-1 language code "co")
- ℅ (c/o), a character in the Unicode Letterlike Symbols block, meaning 'care of'
- c/o, former name of Gerhardsen Gerner, an art gallery in Berlin

== See also ==
- C0 (disambiguation), the letter–number combination C zero
- Care of (disambiguation)
- Cobalt (disambiguation)
- Co-Co locomotives
