= Non-lock concurrency control =

In computer science, in the field of databases, non-lock concurrency control is a concurrency control method used in relational databases without using locking.

There are several non-lock concurrency control methods, which involve the use of timestamps on transaction to determine transaction priority:

- Optimistic concurrency control
  - Timestamp-based concurrency control
  - Validation-based concurrency control
  - Multiversion concurrency control
    - Snapshot isolation

== See also ==
- Concurrency pattern
- InterBase
- Lock-free and wait-free algorithms
