= Malcolm Crowe =

Irish computer scientist and mathematician

Malcolm Kenneth Crowe
- Born: January 13, 1948 (age 78); Dublin, Ireland
- Occupation: computer scientist
- Known for: Pyrrho RDBMS

Academic work
- Discipline: Computer science
- Main interests: Philosophy
- Notable works: Pyrrho DBMS
- Website: Official website

Malcolm Kenneth Crowe is an Irish computer scientist and mathematician who retired to become professor emeritus at the University of West of Scotland after 46 years of service.

== Biography ==
So when I consider why academics do research, I think of participation in the joy of discovery and debate, the creation of new knowledge, and the timeless academe.

— Crowe, Malcolm

Crowe was born in Dublin on 13 January 1948. Studies in the final year of school encouraged an interest in philosophy. He gained a 1st class honours degree from Trinity College Dublin in 1969.

Crowe gained employment as a lecturer at Paisley College of Technology in Scotland in 1972, remaining with the institution through its transition to Paisley University in 1992 and finally to the University of the West of Scotland (UWS) in 2007.

His D.Phil. in Mathematics was awarded from Oxford University in 1979.

Although trained as a mathematician Crowe's interest turned increasingly towards computing. He became Head of Computing in Paisley in 1985, introducing an interpretivist degree in information systems, resulting in a "culture clash".

Crowe was involved in the European Strategic Program on Research in Information Technology (ESPIRIT) in the 1980s and 1990s.

2006 saw him develop the Pyrrho lightweight database management system. UWS set up licensing so it could be commercially exploited but in practice has been utilised in an educational role, with the European sponsored DBTechNET initiative and as an addendum to the 5th edition of UWS's Connolly and Begg book "Database Systems, A Practical Approach to Design, Implementation, and Management". Crowe retired from UWS in 2018 after a working life of 46 years at the same institution. He has continued his participation in computer science with 2019 seeing a version 7 of his PyrrhoDB having an alpha release, development of a new Database Management System, StrongDBMS.

=== Pyrrho DBMS ===
Crowe developed the Pyrrho Database Management System (DBMS) in the 2000s to explore optimistic concurrency control and other features applicable to relational databases.

== Bibliography ==
- Atkinson, John; Crowe, M. K. (2006). Interdisciplinary research : diverse approaches in science, technology, health and society. Chichester, England & Hoboken, New Jersey: John Wiley & Sons. OCLC 65617525. OL 18207825W.
- Crowe, Malcolm K. (1996). "The verses of Heraclitus of Ephesus". The Systemist. 18. UK Systems Society: 161–176.
- —— (2015). The Pyrrho Book (PDF). University of the West of Scotland. ISBN 978-1-903978-50-4.
