= Serializable =

Serializable may refer to:

- Serializable (databases), an attribute of a database transaction's schedule (history)
- capable of being serialized, or transformed into a stored representation
