= Locks with ordered sharing =

In databases and transaction processing the term Locks with ordered sharing comprises several variants of the two-phase locking (2PL) concurrency control protocol generated by changing the blocking semantics of locks upon conflicts. Further softening of locks eliminates thrashing.

== See also ==
- Autonomic computing
