= OC =

Oc, OC or O.C. may refer to:

== Arts and entertainment ==
- The O.C., an American television show set in Orange County, California
- The O.C. (professional wrestling), a professional wrestling stable in WWE
- Original character, a type of character used in fandoms

== Brands, businesses, and organizations ==
- OC Transpo, a public transit company in Ottawa and Carleton in Ontario, Canada
- Organisation Consul, a former terrorist organization active in Germany from 1920 to 1922
- Oregon Crusaders Drum and Bugle Corps, a Drum Corps International group commonly abbreviated as "OC"
- Ornithological Council
- Owens Corning, NYSE ticker symbol
- Oxi Clean, a cleaning product
- Orbis Communications, a former television distribution company
- PGA Express (IATA code "OC" 2001–2015)
- Air California (IATA Code "OC" 1967–1987)

== Education ==
- Oaklands College, a further education in central Hertfordshire, UK
- Oakwood College, a college in northern Alabama, USA, affiliated with the Seventh-day Adventist Church
- Oberlin College, a liberal arts college in Ohio
- Oklahoma Christian University
- Old Carthusian, one who attended Charterhouse School
- Old Colchestrian, one who attended Colchester Royal Grammar School
- Old Chigwellian, one who attended Chigwell School
- Orewa College, a college in the North Island, New Zealand

== Places ==
=== United States ===
- Oak Cliff, a community in Dallas, Texas
- Oakland–Alameda County Coliseum, a stadium in Oakland, California and the home of the Oakland Raiders
- Oakland County, Michigan
- Ocean City, Maryland, a prominent beach resort town in the mid-Atlantic region
- Ocean City, New Jersey, a family-oriented seaside resort town near Atlantic City
- Oceanside, California, a beachside city located within San Diego County
- Oklahoma City, Oklahoma, the capital of the U.S. state of Oklahoma
- Osceola, Indiana
- Oregon City, Oregon, the county seat of Clackamas County, Oregon

==== Counties ====
- Ocean County, New Jersey
- Oconee County, Georgia
- Oconee County, South Carolina
- Orange County, California, the 3rd most populous county in the U.S. state of California, housing Los Angeles metropolitan area
- Orange County, Florida, a county in the U.S. state of Florida, home to Orlando, Florida
- Orange County, Indiana
- Orange County, New York
- Orange County, North Carolina
- Orange County, Texas, county seat of Orange, Texas
- Orange County, Vermont
- Orange County, Virginia

=== Elsewhere ===
- Ottawa—Carleton (federal electoral district), a federal electoral district in Ontario, Canada
- Old Colwyn, Wales

== Roles and titles ==
- Officer of the Order of Canada, post-nominal letters for a grade within the Canadian order
- Offensive coordinator, a coaching position in American and Canadian football
- Officer candidate
- Officer commanding, in military use

== Technology ==
- Oleoresin capsaicin or oleoresin capsicum, the active ingredient in pepper spray and OC gas
  - OC spray, also known as pepper spray
- Open collector, electrical interface. Used in data communication
- openCanvas, a raster graphics software
- oc, the executable for OpenShift CLI, a command line interface for OpenShift
- Optical Carrier levels in the SONET fiber-optic network specification
- Oral contraceptive, usually referring to the combined oral contraceptive pill
- Organ-on-a-chip, microfluidic device that simulates whole physiological and mechanical organ responses
- Overclocking, the process of forcing a computer component to run at a higher clock rate than it was designed for
- Overcurrent, an excessive value of electric current

== Languages ==
- Occitan language (ISO 639 alpha-2 oc)
- Old Chinese, the earliest attested stage of the Chinese language

== Other uses ==
- o.c. or op. cit., opere citato
- O.C. (rapper) (born 1971), American rapper
- Offering circular, in finance, for a bond offering
- Order of Carmelites, a Roman Catholic order
- Organized crime, in law
- On-center, in construction, indicating that the distance quoted is between the centers of neighboring wall studs, joists, or other members
- Original content, original character, or original contribution, used to assert one's authorship of a given subject matter
- Outrigger canoe
- Other Caste or Open Category, a caste designation used in governmental forms in India, usually referring to Forward Castes

== See also ==
- °C
- 0C (disambiguation), the number–letter combination
- Orange County (disambiguation)
