= C° =

C° can mean:

- Celsius degrees (conventionally written °C)
- In chemistry, the standard state for solute concentration

== See also ==
- C0 (disambiguation)
