= BRST =

BRST may refer to:

- BRST Films, a Serbian video production company
- BRST algorithm, an optimization algorithm suitable for finding the global optimum of black box functions
- BRST quantization in Yang-Mills theories, a way to quantize a gauge-symmetric field theory
- Brasília Summer Time
- Burst.com, from its stock ticker, now Democrasoft
