= Blind write =

Computing term

In computing, a blind write, also known as a write-only transaction, occurs when a transaction writes a value without reading it. In particular, if a read r(X) of a resource X does not occur before a write w(X) to that resource in a transaction, then w(X) is blind write.

Blind writes can cause anomalies if multiple different blind write transactions are executed at the same time.

Any view serializable schedule that is not conflict serializable must contain a blind write.
