= 0C =

0C (zero C) or 0-C may refer to:

- 0 °C, the melting point of ice on the Celsius scale
- 0C, or zero carbon
  - Zero carbon building
  - Zero carbon city
- 0 configuration networking, or zero-configuration networking, a set of techniques that automatically creates a usable Internet Protocol (IP) network
- 0-coupon bond, or Zero-coupon bond, a type of discount bond
- 0 copula, or Zero copula, a linguistic phenomenon where a subject is joined to a predicate without overt marking of this relationship
- 0 crossing, or Zero crossing, a point where the sign of a function crosses the zero axis
- 0 consonant, or Zero consonant, a consonant-like letter that is not pronounced

== See also ==
- C0 (disambiguation)
- OC (disambiguation)
