= Orange County =

Orange County may refer to:

== Counties within the United States ==
- Orange County, California, part of the Los Angeles metropolitan area
- Orange County, Florida, containing Orlando, Florida
- Orange County, Indiana
- Orange County, New York, part of the Hudson Valley area
- Orange County, North Carolina, containing UNC Chapel Hill
- Orange County, Texas
- Orange County, Vermont
- Orange County, Virginia

== Other uses ==
- Orange County (film), 2002 film set in Orange County, California
- County of Orange, a feudal state of The Holy Roman Empire from c. 800 to 1163, later the Principality of Orange
- Orange County Choppers, American motorbike manufacturer
- Alexander James O'Connor, known professionally as "Rex Orange County"
- Ju Jun, also known as "Orange County", an American-style suburb near Beijing, China
- Orange County Drum and Percussion, an American drum manufacturer
- "Orange County", a 2026 song by Gorillaz from their album The Mountain

== See also ==
- Orange County Airport (disambiguation)
- Orange County SC, an association football club based in Irvine, California
- Orang County, North Hamgyŏng, North Korea
- The O.C., television show named after Orange County, California
