= Timestamping (computing) =

Event metadata

In computing, timestamping refers to the use of an electronic timestamp to provide a temporal order among a set of events.

Timestamping techniques are used in a variety of computing fields, from network management and computer security to concurrency control. For instance, a heartbeat network uses timestamping to monitor the nodes on a high availability computer cluster.

Timestamping computer files (updating the timestamp in the per-file metadata every time a file is modified) makes it possible to use efficient build automation tools.

== See also ==
- Trusted timestamping
- Timestamp-based concurrency control
- Lamport timestamp
