= C0 =

C0 or C00 has several uses including:

- C0, the IATA code for Centralwings airline
- C0 and C1 control codes
- a CPU power state in the Advanced Configuration and Power Interface
- an alternate name for crt0, a library used in the startup of a C program
- in mathematics:
  - the differentiability class C^{0}
  - a C_{0}-semigroup, a strongly continuous one-parameter semigroup
  - c_{0}, the Banach space of real sequences that converge to zero
  - a C_{0} field is an algebraically closed field
- in physics, c_{0}, the speed of light in vacuum
- %C0, the URL-encoded version of the character "À"
- C0, a note-octave in music
- an ISO 216 paper format size
- C00, the ICD-10 code for oral cancer
- C° could refer to:
  - An abbreviation for Celsius degrees
  - In chemistry, the standard state for solute concentration

== See also ==
- CO (disambiguation), the two letter combination
- 0C (disambiguation)
