= Care of =

Postal service term

c/o or ℅, short for "care of" (literally "in the care of," meaning "residing at"), is an abbreviation used for delivery instructions by postal services.

c/o is used below the recipient's name on the address side of a letter and allows delivery to recipients who do not have their own mailbox. Examples include subtenants or residents of hospitals, nursing homes, hotels, and similar facilities.

Depending on the font and size used, the single character ℅ may be less legible than the three characters c/o and can easily be confused with the percent sign %.
