= Orange County Airport (disambiguation) =

Orange County Airport is the original name of the John Wayne Airport in Santa Ana, Orange County, California

Orange County Airport may also refer to:

- Orange County Airport (New York), a general aviation airport in Montgomery, Orange County, New York
- Orange County Airport (Texas), a general aviation airport in Orange, Orange County, Texas
- Orange County Airport (Virginia), a general aviation airport in Orange, Orange County, Virginia
