= Timestamp =

Information identifying when an event occurred

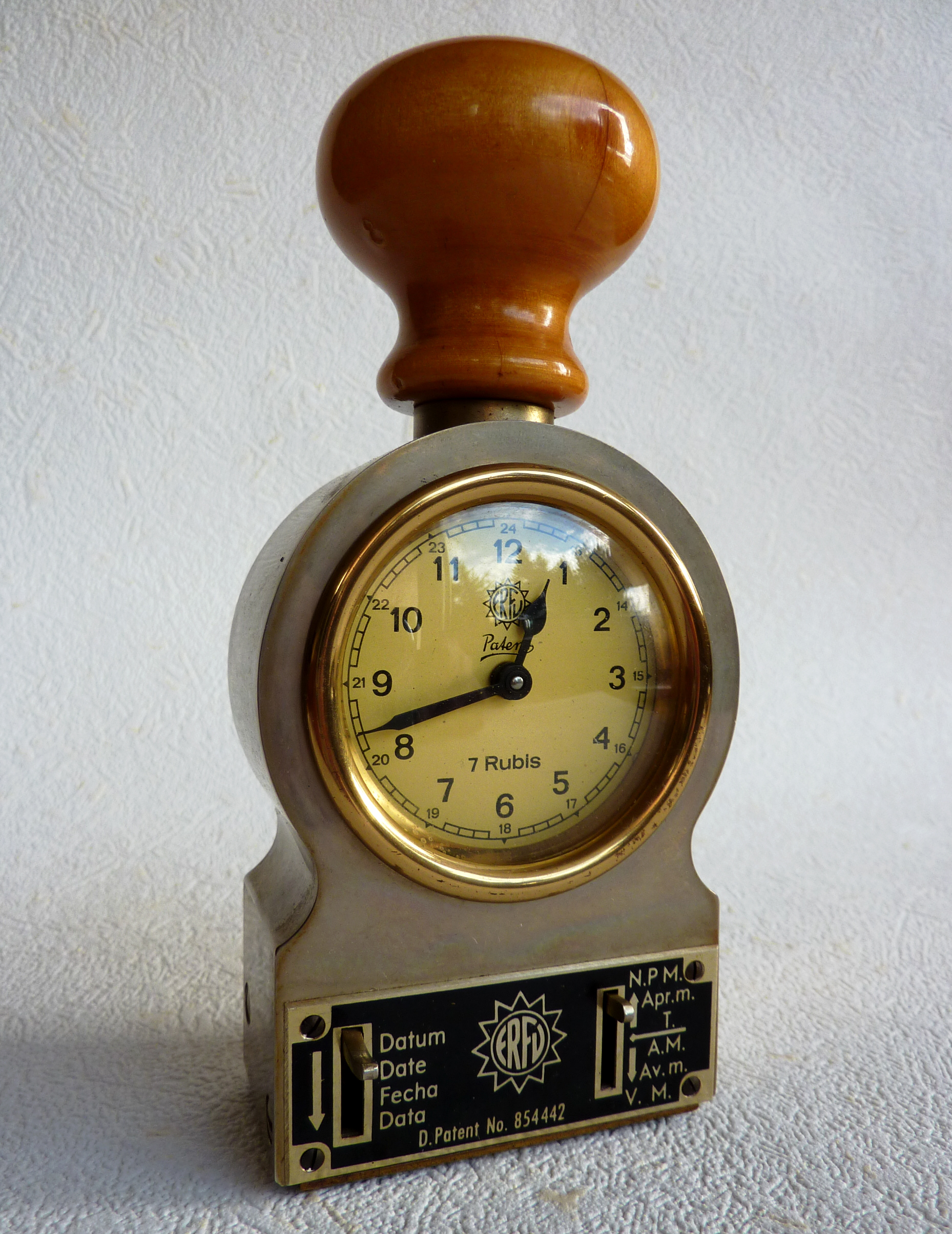
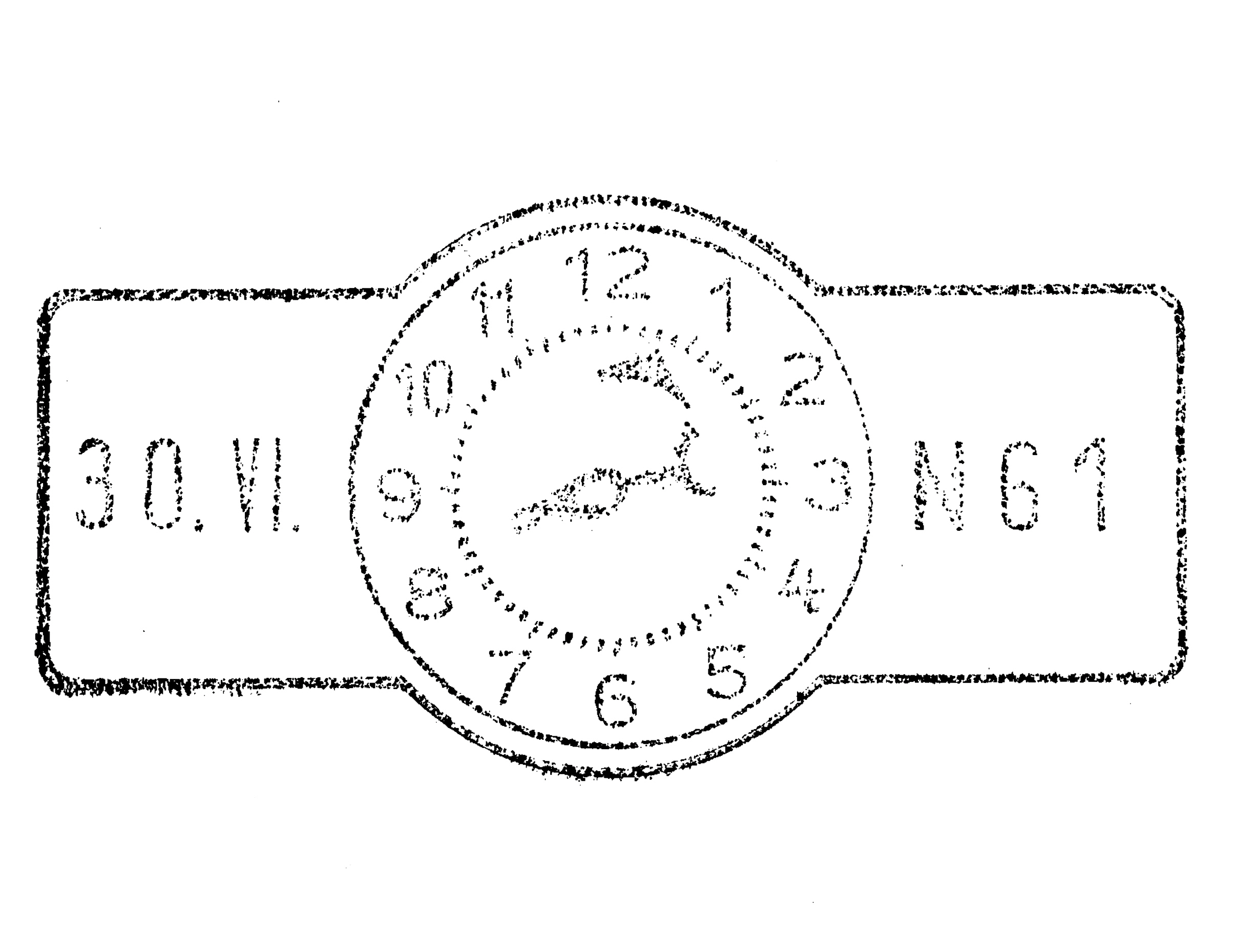
An actual time-stamp from around 1960.

A timestamp is a sequence of characters or encoded information identifying when a certain event occurred, usually giving the date and time of day, sometimes accurate to a small fraction of a second. Timestamps do not have to be based on some absolute notion of time, however. They can have any epoch, can be relative to any arbitrary time, such as the power-on time of a system or some arbitrary time in the past.

A distinction is sometimes made between the terms datestamp (DS), timestamp (TS) and date-timestamp (DTS):

- Datestamp: A date, for example 2026-08-12 according to ISO 8601
- Timestamp: A time of day, for example 04:01:59 (using the 24-hour clock)
- Date-timestamp: Date and time, for example 2026-08-12T04:01:59 (ISO 8601)

== History ==
The term "timestamp" derives from rubber stamps used in offices to stamp the current date, and sometimes time, in ink on paper documents, to record when the document was received. Common examples of this type of timestamp are a postmark on a letter or the "in" and "out" times on a time card.

With the advent of digital data systems, the term has expanded to refer to digital date and time information attached to digital data. For example, computer files contain timestamps that indicate when the file was last modified, and digital cameras add timestamps to the pictures they take, recording the date and time the picture was taken.

== Digital timestamps ==
Timestamps are usually presented in a consistent format, allowing for easy comparison of multiple records and the tracking progress over time; the practice of recording timestamps in a consistent manner along with the actual data is called timestamping.

Timestamps are frequently used for logging events or in a sequence of events (SOE), in which case each event in the log or SOE is marked with a timestamp.

Practically all computer file systems store one or more timestamps in the per-file metadata. In particular, most modern operating systems support the POSIX stat (system call), whereby each file has three timestamps associated with it: time of last access (atime: ls -lu), time of last modification (mtime: ls -l), and time of last status change (ctime: ls -lc).

When some file archivers and version control systems copy a file from a remote computer to the local computer, they adjust the timestamps of the local file to show the date/time in the past when that file was created or modified on the remote computer, rather than the date/time when that file was copied to the local computer.

Timestamps are often found to be "dirty" in many cases. Without cleaning up inaccurate timestamps, time-related applications such as provenance analysis or pattern queries are not reliable. To evaluate the correctness of timestamps, temporal constraints can be applied, declaring distance limits between timestamps.

== Standardization ==
ISO 8601 standardizes the representation of dates and times. These standard representations are often used to construct timestamp values.

== Examples ==
Examples of date-timestamps:

- Thurs 12/31/2009 1:35 p.m. — mixed-endian date, big-endian 12-hour clock
- Thurs 31.12.2009 13:35 — same time as the above, different format with little-endian date and big-endian 24-hour clock
- 2005-10-30 T 10:45 UTC — ISO 8601 international order (big-endian) with time zone)
- 2007-11-09 T 11:20 UTC — same format as the above, hence easy to compare and perform alphanumeric sorting
- Sat Jul 23 02:16:57 2005
- 2009-10-31T01:48:52Z — ISO 8601
- 2009-10-31 01:48:52Z — "Internet time" per RFC 3339, based on ISO 8601
- 1256953732 — Unix time, equivalent to 2009-10-31 T 01:48:52Z
- 1969-07-21 T 02:56 UTC
- 07:38, 11 December 2012 (UTC)
- 1985-102 T 10:15 UTC — year 1985, day number 102, i.e., 1985 April 12
- 1985-W15-5 T 10:15 UTC — year 1985, week number 15, weekday 5 = 1985 April 12
- 20180203073000 — used in Wayback Machine memento URLs, equals 3 February 2018 07:30:00

Examples of datestamps:

- 2025-05-25 — ISO 8601 international representation of 2025 May 25

Examples of timestamps:

- 17:30:23 — time of day in an afternoon
- 123478382 ns — the number of nanoseconds since boot
- 17 minutes — an arbitrary minute counter that increments every 1 minute since its last manual "reset" event

Sequence number:

- 21 — a unitless counter that indicates only the relative order of events; this is event #21, which comes after 20 and before 22

== See also ==
- Advanced electronic signature
- Backdating and forward dating, signing a document with a timestamp (sometimes legitimately) representing a point in time either forwards or backwards
- Bates numbering
- Decentralized trusted timestamping on the blockchain
- Sequence number, consecutive number in a sequence of numbers, for example used in sorting
- Linked timestamping
- Timestamping (computing)
- Timestamp-based concurrency control
- Trusted timestamping
