= Local algorithm =

Type of distributed algorithm

A local algorithm is a distributed algorithm that runs in constant time, independently of the size of the network.
