= Pankaj Jindal =

Pankaj Jindal is the co-founder of Sense Talent Labs (Sense HQ), located in San Francisco, CA. Previously he was the CEO of Akraya Inc (April 2013 – November 2015), a staffing and recruiting firm located in Silicon Valley, CA. Pankaj has been in business since 1999. He is a charter member of The Indus Entrepreneurs (TiE) Silicon Valley.

== Awards and recognition ==
In 2014, Pankaj made the Silicon Valley Business Journal's "40 Under 40" List.
