= Proto.in =

Proto.in is an Indian start-up event platform which had its first edition in January 2007. The platform was started by Chennai based not-for profit body The Knowledge Foundation with entrepreneur Vijay Anand as its curator and founder. The Knowledge Foundation is a not-for profit knowledge dissemination body which has had multiple events in Chennai including Blog Camp, Bar Camp, Wikicamp (inaugurated by Jimmy Wales) and Pod Works.

Since its first event in Jan 2007, Proto.in has had 8 editions across the cities of Chennai, New Delhi, Mumbai, Bangalore and Pune. The sole focus and objective of the event is to showcase 15 of the most innovative start-ups in the country and provide them with a platform in front of an audience of investors, entrepreneurs and customers alike.

== Event format ==
The event format is centered around the 'Showcase'. This is where 15 start-ups take the stage one by one and demo their products for 6 minutes each. The start-ups are generally slotted into categories - some of the popular ones in the previous editions of Proto.in have been Internet, Software, Mobile and Outliers which generally contains start-ups from a myriad set of sectors.

== Nomination process ==
The nomination process is one where a start-up needs to complete a nomination form that can be filled on the site. Start-ups are then evaluated on the basis of a broad set of criteria. The nomination panel is one which includes individuals from the field including start-up evangelists, entrepreneurs, Proto.in alumni and investors.

== Support partners ==
Proto.in has had a broadbase of knowledge partners, mentors and advisors. NASSCOM and TiE have been Knowledge Partners of Proto.in right from the platform's inception. The event has been supported and sponsored by a broad base of partners including the likes of Rediff.com, Microsoft, Google, Facebook, Airtel, Cisco and Sequoia Capital. Sequoia Capital has been the event platform's platinum sponsor for its last 2 editions.

== Showcased start-ups ==
From the platform's inception, approximately 150 start-ups have showcased themselves at Proto.in over its last four years. Out of the total 150 start-ups that have showcased themselves at the event, research suggests that at least 35 have shut down or have merged to form another entity. 25 have raised funding of some form.

== Sources ==
- https://web.archive.org/web/20090905084422/http://www.proto.in/reach/faq/ *http://specials.rediff.com/money/2007/jan/19proto.htm
- http://www.moneycontrol.com/india/news/pressnews/the-next-google-could-be-you/284457
- https://web.archive.org/web/20090129024802/http://www.efytimes.com/efytimes/fullnews.asp?edid=19388
- http://www.thehindubusinessline.com/2007/06/07/stories/2007060702210400.htm
- http://www.livemint.com/2007/07/22181826/23-hopeful-startups-make-the.html
- http://www.thehindubusinessline.com/2008/01/15/stories/2008011552370400.htm
- http://www.newswiretoday.com/news/36315/
- http://www.rediff.com/getahead/slide-show/slide-show-1-career-are-these-the-hottest-15-indian-startups/20110713.htm
- https://web.archive.org/web/20110930045239/http://www.vccircle.com/500/content/protoin-showcases-startups-to-vcs
- https://web.archive.org/web/20120319042713/http://apnnews.com/2011/07/12/proto-in-to-showcase-15-of-indias-hottest-start-ups/
- https://web.archive.org/web/20120328091726/http://godinchief.instablogs.com/entry/startups-rock-at-protoin-should-techcrunch50-demo-look-at-india/
