= WFG =

WFG may refer to:

- Wait-For Graph, in computer science
- Waveform generator, in electrical signals
- World Financial Group, a multi-level marketing company
