= Ostrich algorithm =

Strategy in computer science

In computer science, the ostrich algorithm is a strategy of ignoring potential problems on the basis that they may be exceedingly rare. It is named after the ostrich effect, which is defined as "to stick one's head in the sand and pretend there is no problem." Practically, it is sometimes more cost-effective to ignore a failure condition than to spend valuable resources protecting against it.

== Use with deadlocks ==
This approach may be used in dealing with deadlocks in concurrent programming if they are believed to be very rare and the cost of detection or prevention is high. A set of processes is deadlocked if each process in the set is waiting for an event that only another process in the set can cause.

The ostrich algorithm pretends there is no problem and is reasonable to use if deadlocks occur very rarely and the cost of their prevention would be high. The UNIX and Windows operating systems take this approach.

Although using the ostrich algorithm is one of the methods of dealing with deadlocks, other effective methods exist such as dynamic avoidance, banker's algorithm, detection and recovery, and prevention.

== See also ==
- Crash-only software
- End-to-end principle
