= Vasant Dhar =

Indian academic

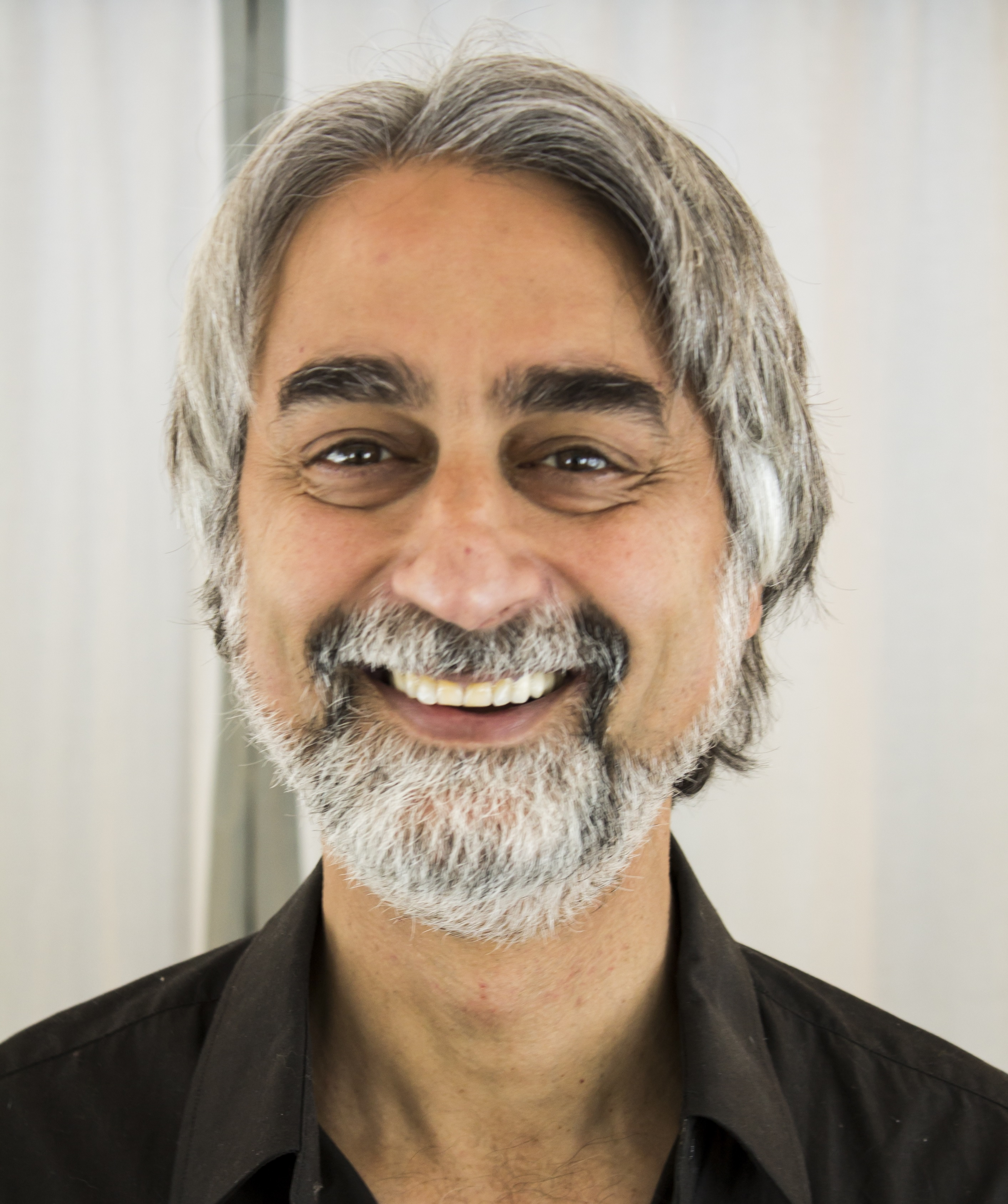
- Vasant Dhar, Former Editor-in-Chief, Big Data Journal; Professor, Stern School of Business; Faculty, NYU Center for Data Science
- Education: The Lawrence School, Sanawar; Indian Institute of Technology Delhi; University of Pittsburgh
- Scientific career
- Fields: Data science Information systems Machine learning Artificial intelligence Big data Finance
- Workplaces: New York University

Vasant Dhar is a professor at the Stern School of Business and the Center for Data Science at New York University, former editor-in-chief of the journal Big Data and the founder of SCT Capital, a machine-learning-based hedge fund established in 1998. His research focuses on building scalable decision-making systems from large sources of data using techniques and principles from the disciplines of artificial intelligence and machine learning.

== Early life and education ==
Dhar is an alumnus of The Lawrence School, Sanawar. He graduated from the Indian Institute of Technology Delhi in 1978 with a B.Tech and subsequently attended the University of Pittsburgh where he received an M. Phil and a Ph.D.. After earning his doctorate, he joined the faculty at New York University. He worked at Morgan Stanley between 1994 and 1997 where he founded the Data Mining Group, focusing on automated trading and asset management profiling.

== Career highlights ==
Dhar is an artificial intelligence researcher and data scientist whose research addresses the question, when do we trust AI systems with decision making? The question is particularly relevant to current-day autonomous machine-learning-based systems that learn and adapt with ongoing data. His research has been motivated by building predictive models in a number of domains, most notably finance, as well as areas including healthcare, sports, education and business, asking why are we willing to trust machines in some areas and not others? His view is that there is a discontinuity when we give complete decision-making control to a machine that learns from ongoing data. This discontinuity introduces some risks, specifically those around the errors made by such systems, which directly affect our degree of trust in them.

Dhar's research breaks down trust along two risk-based dimensions: predictability, or how frequently a system makes mistakes (X-axis), and the associated costs of error (Y-axis) of such mistakes. The research demonstrates the existence of a "frontier" that expresses a trade-off between how often a system will be wrong and the consequences of such mistakes. Trust, and hence our willingness to cede control of decision making to the machine, increases with increasing predictability and lower error costs. In other words, we are willing to trust machines if they do not make too many mistakes and their costs are tolerable. As mistakes increase, we require that their consequences be less costly.

The automation frontier provides a natural way to think about the future of work. With more and better data and algorithms, parts of existing processes become automated due to increased predictability, and cross the automation frontier into the "trust the machine" zone, whereas the parts with high error costs remain under human control. The model provides a way to think about the changing responsibilities of humans and machines as more data and better algorithms become better than humans with decisions.

Dhar also uses the framework to frame policy issues around the risks of AI-based social media platforms and issues of privacy and ethical uses and governance of data. He writes regularly in the media on artificial intelligence, societal risks of AI platforms, data governance, privacy, ethics, and trust. He is a frequent speaker in academic as well as industrial forums.

Dhar teaches courses on systematic investing, prediction, data science and the foundations of FinTech. He has written over 100 research articles, funded by grants from industry and government agencies such as the National Science Foundation. He also produces the interview style Brave New World Podcast which has, to date over 100 episodes, which covers issues in technology and artificial intelligence.

== Books ==
Intelligent Decision Support Methods: The Science of Knowledge Work, with Roger Stein, Prentice Hall, ISBN 978-01351-9935-0, 1996

Thinking with Machines: The Brave New World of AI, Wiley, ISBN 978-1-394-35905-9, 2026

== See also ==
- Data science
- Predictive analytics
