= Suhas Patil =

Indian-American businessman (born 1944)

- Born: 1944 (age 81–82)
- Education: IIT Kharagpur (B.Tech.); Massachusetts Institute of Technology (MS, PhD)
- Known for: Founder of Cirrus Logic
- Children: DJ Patil

Suhas S. Patil (born 1944) is an Indian-American entrepreneur, academic, and venture capitalist. He founded Cirrus Logic, a fabless semiconductor company. Patil's work has covered computer architecture, parallel processing computers, very-large-scale integration devices, and integrated circuit design automation software. He also serves on the boards of The Tech Museum and the World Affairs Council of Northern California. He is known for describing the "cigarette smokers problem" for concurrent computing in 1971.

== Early life and education ==
Patil grew up in Jamshedpur, India. His father was the first person in the family to go to a university and get an engineering degree and worked at Tata Steel while Patil was growing up. Patil went to study intermediate science at St. Xavier's College, Kolkata and then to the Indian Institute of Technology Kharagpur for his bachelor's degree in electrical engineering. He attended the Massachusetts Institute of Technology for his masters and doctorate degrees, graduating in 1967 and 1970 respectively.

== Career ==
From 1970 until 1975, Patil was assistant professor of electrical engineering at Massachusetts Institute of Technology. While at MIT, he also served as assistant director of Project MAC (Multi-Access Computer), the largest computer science laboratory in the U.S., where the timesharing computer system was developed. At MIT, he worked in the area of computer architecture and related topics. As a gift to the Massachusetts Institute of Technology, Patil awarded $1.5 million for the construction of the Suhas and Jayashree Patil Conference Center at the Stata Center. From 1977 to 1981, he was a member of the faculty at the University of Utah School of Computing. Patil founded Patil Systems, Inc., in 1981 in Salt Lake City, which was renamed as Cirrus Logic in 1984 when it moved to Silicon Valley. He has been the Chairman of Cirrus Logic since its founding and Emeritus since 1997. He is currently the Chairman of Digité, Inc. and Chairman of the Board of Cradle Technologies.

Patil co-founded a global not for profit organization, the TiE – The Ind-US Entrepreneurs in 1992 with successful entrepreneurs and businessowners of Indian origin in Silicon Valley to mentor entrepreneurs and young companies. He served as TiE's first president.

== Personal life ==
Patil's son is DJ Patil, who was the first Chief Data Scientist of the United States Office of Science and Technology Policy.

== See also ==
- Cigarette smokers problem
