= Readers–writers problem =

Computer science problem in concurrency

In computer science, the readers–writers problems are examples of a common computing problem in concurrency. There are at least three variations of the problems, which deal with situations in which many concurrent threads of execution try to access the same shared resource at one time.

Some threads may read and some may write, with the constraint that no thread may access the shared resource for either reading or writing while another thread is in the act of writing to it. (In particular, we want to prevent more than one thread modifying the shared resource simultaneously and allow for two or more readers to access the shared resource at the same time). A readers–writer lock is a data structure that solves one or more of the readers–writers problems.

The basic reader–writers problem was first formulated and solved by Courtois et al.

== First readers–writers problem ==
Suppose we have a shared memory area (critical section) with the basic constraints detailed above. It is possible to protect the shared data behind a mutual exclusion mutex, in which case no two threads can access the data at the same time. However, this solution is sub-optimal, because it is possible that a reader R_{1} might have the lock, and then another reader R_{2} requests access. It would be foolish for R_{2} to wait until R_{1} was done before starting its own read operation; instead, R_{2} should be allowed to read the resource alongside R_{1} because reads don't modify data, so concurrent reads are safe. This is the motivation for the first readers–writers problem, in which the constraint is added that no reader shall be kept waiting if the share is currently opened for reading. This is also called readers-preference, with its solution:

semaphore resource=1;
semaphore rmutex=1;
readcount=0;

/*
   resource.P() is equivalent to wait(resource)
   resource.V() is equivalent to signal(resource)
   rmutex.P() is equivalent to wait(rmutex)
   rmutex.V() is equivalent to signal(rmutex)
*/

writer() {
    resource.P();          //Lock the shared file for a writer

    <CRITICAL Section>
    // Writing is done

    resource.V();          //Release the shared file for use by other readers. Writers are allowed if there are no readers requesting it.
}

reader() {
    <ENTRY Section>
    rmutex.P();           //Ensure that no other reader can execute the <Entry> section while you are in it
    readcount++;          //Indicate that you are a reader trying to enter the Critical Section
    if (readcount == 1)   //Checks if you are the first reader trying to enter CS
        resource.P();     //If you are the first reader, lock the resource from writers. Resource stays reserved for subsequent readers
    rmutex.V();           //Release

    <CRITICAL Section>
    // Do the Reading

    <EXIT Section>
    rmutex.P();           //Ensure that no other reader can execute the <Exit> section while you are in it
    readcount--;          //Indicate that you no longer need the shared resource. One fewer reader
    if (readcount == 0)   //Checks if you are the last (only) reader who is reading the shared file
        resource.V();     //If you are last reader, then you can unlock the resource. This makes it available to writers.
    rmutex.V();           //Release
}

In this solution of the readers/writers problem, the first reader must lock the resource (shared file) if such is available. Once the file is locked from writers, it may be used by many subsequent readers without having them to re-lock it again.

Before entering the critical section, every new reader must go through the entry section. However, there may only be a single reader in the entry section at a time. This is done to avoid race conditions on the readers (in this context, a race condition is a condition in which two or more threads are waking up simultaneously and trying to enter the critical section; without further constraint, the behavior is nondeterministic. E.g. two readers increment the readcount at the same time, and both try to lock the resource, causing one reader to block). To accomplish this, every reader which enters the <ENTRY Section> will lock the <ENTRY Section> for themselves until they are done with it. At this point the readers are not locking the resource. They are only locking the entry section so no other reader can enter it while they are in it. Once the reader is done executing the entry section, it will unlock it by signaling the mutex. Signaling it is equivalent to: mutex.V() in the above code. Same is valid for the <EXIT Section>. There can be no more than a single reader in the exit section at a time, therefore, every reader must claim and lock the Exit section for themselves before using it.

Once the first reader is in the entry section, it will lock the resource. Doing this will prevent any writers from accessing it. Subsequent readers can just utilize the locked (from writers) resource. The reader to finish last (indicated by the readcount variable) must unlock the resource, thus making it available to writers.

In this solution, every writer must claim the resource individually. This means that a stream of readers can subsequently lock all potential writers out and starve them. This is so, because after the first reader locks the resource, no writer can lock it, before it gets released. And it will only be released by the last reader. Hence, this solution does not satisfy fairness.

== Second readers–writers problem ==
The first solution has a downside in that it can result in resource starvation, where it becomes impossible to write to a file if it is constantly being read from. If a reader R_{1} has the lock while a writer W is waiting for the lock, and then a reader R_{2} requests access, it could be considered "unfair" for R_{2} to jump in immediately, ahead of W. This is the motivation for the second readers–writers problem, in which the constraint is added that no writer, once added to the queue, shall be kept waiting longer than absolutely necessary. This is also called writers-preference.

A solution to the writers-preference scenario is:

int readcount, writecount;                   //(initial value = 0)
semaphore readcount_mutex, writecount_mutex, readTry, reader_mutex, writer_mutex; //(initial value = 1)

//READER
reader() {
    <ENTRY Section>
    readTry.P();            //prevent multiple readers from waiting for a writer
    reader_mutex.P();       //lock entry section or wait for writers as needed
    readcount_mutex.P();    //prevent races locking the writer and readcount
    readcount++;            //increment readers
    if (readcount == 1)     //checks if you are first reader
        writer_mutex.P();   //if you are first reader, prevent write access
    readcount_mutex.V();
    reader_mutex.V();       //release entry section and allow writer to take if needed
    readTry.V();            //indicate you are done trying to access the resource

    <CRITICAL Section>
    //reading is performed

    <EXIT Section>
    readcount_mutex.P();    //avoid race condition on readcount with other readers
    readcount--;            //indicate you're leaving
    if (readcount == 0)     //checks if you are last reader leaving
        writer_mutex.V();       //if last, you must release the locked resource
    readcount_mutex.V();    //release exit section for other readers
}

//WRITER
writer() {
    <ENTRY Section>         //from here ENTRY Section starts
    writecount_mutex.P();   //avoid race conditions on writecount with other writers
    writecount++;           //report yourself as a writer entering
    if (writecount == 1)    //checks if you're first writer
        reader_mutex.P();   //if you're first, then you must lock the readers out. Prevent them from trying to enter CS
    writecount_mutex.V();   //release entry section

    <CRITICAL Section>      //from here CRITICAL Section starts
    writer_mutex.P();       //reserve the resource for yourself - prevents other writers from simultaneously editing the shared resource
    //writing is performed
    writer_mutex.V();       //release file

    <EXIT Section>          //from here EXIT Section starts
    writecount_mutex.P();   //reserve exit section
    writecount--;           //indicate you're leaving
    if (writecount == 0)    //checks if you're the last writer
        reader_mutex.V();   //if you're last writer, you must unlock the readers. Allows them to try enter CS for reading
    writecount_mutex.V();   //release exit section
}

In this solution, preference is given to the writers. This is accomplished by forcing every reader to lock and release the readTry semaphore individually. Thus, only one reader will be able to signify that it is trying to read at a given time by attempting to acquire the reader_mutex semaphore. At this point, if one or more writers have declared themselves, the first one will have already acquired the reader_mutex semaphore, causing the reader to block. Only once there are no other writers will that reader be able to proceed. Since readcount is modified in multiple places, access to it must be locked behind readcount_mutex.

Multiple writers can declare themselves by incrementing writecount; however, only the first writer will lock the reader_mutex to prevent readers from proceeding. Subsequent writers then use the resource sequentially by acquiring the writer_mutex before the write operation and releasing it after. The very last writer must release the reader_mutex semaphore, thus opening the gate for readers to try reading.

Note that if and only if there are no writers, the readTry and reader_mutex semaphores are redundant with readcount_mutex, serving only to prevent race conditions on the readcount variable. Multiple readers will thus be allowed to declare themselves and read the shared data simultaneously.

== Third readers–writers problem ==
In fact, the solutions implied by both problem statements can result in starvation — the first one may starve writers in the queue, and the second one may starve readers. Therefore, the third readers–writers problem is sometimes proposed, which adds the constraint that no thread shall be allowed to starve; that is, the operation of obtaining a lock on the shared data will always terminate in a bounded amount of time. A solution with fairness for both readers and writers might be as follows:

int readcount;                // init to 0; number of readers currently accessing resource

// all semaphores initialised to 1
semaphore resource;           // controls access (read/write) to the resource. Binary semaphore.
semaphore rmutex;             // for syncing changes to shared variable readcount
semaphore serviceQueue;       // FAIRNESS: preserves ordering of requests (signaling must be FIFO)

//READER
reader() {
    <ENTRY Section>
    serviceQueue.P();       // wait in line to be serviced
    rmutex.P();             // request exclusive access to readcount
    readcount++;            // update count of active readers
    if (readcount == 1)     // if I am the first reader
        resource.P();       // request resource access for readers (writers blocked)
    serviceQueue.V();       // let next in line be serviced
    rmutex.V();             // release access to readcount

    <CRITICAL Section>
    //reading is performed

    <EXIT Section>
    rmutex.P();             // request exclusive access to readcount
    readcount--;            // update count of active readers
    if (readcount == 0)     // if there are no readers left
        resource.V();       // release resource access for all
    rmutex.V();             // release access to readcount
}

//WRITER
writer() {
    <ENTRY Section>
    serviceQueue.P();       // wait in line to be serviced
    resource.P();           // request exclusive access to resource
    serviceQueue.V();       // let next in line be serviced

    <CRITICAL Section>
    // writing is performed

    <EXIT Section>
    resource.V();           // release resource access for next reader/writer
}

This solution can only satisfy the condition that "no thread shall be allowed to starve" if and only if semaphores preserve first-in first-out ordering when blocking and releasing threads. Otherwise, a blocked writer, for example, may remain blocked indefinitely with a cycle of other writers decrementing the semaphore before it can.

=== Simplest reader writer problem ===
The simplest reader writer problem which uses only two semaphores and doesn't need an array of readers to read the data in buffer.

Please notice that this solution gets simpler than the general case because it is made equivalent to the Bounded buffer problem, and therefore only N readers are allowed to enter in parallel, N being the size of the buffer. The initial value of read and write semaphores are 0 and N respectively.

==== Reader ====
do {
    wait(read)
    ............
    reading data
    ............
    signal(write)
} while (TRUE);

==== Writer ====
do {
    wait(write)
    .............
    writing data
    .............
    signal(read)
} while (TRUE);

==== Algorithm ====
1. Reader will run after Writer because of read semaphore.
2. Writer will stop writing when the write semaphore has reached 0.
3. Reader will stop reading when the read semaphore has reached 0.

In writer, the value of write semaphore is given to read semaphore and in reader, the value of read is given to write on completion of the loop.

== See also ==
- ABA problem
- Producers-consumers problem
- Dining philosophers problem
- Cigarette smokers problem
- Sleeping barber problem
- Readers–writer lock
- seqlock
- read-copy-update
