= SalesforceIQ =

American software company

- Industry: Customer Relationship Management
- Founded: 2011
- Founder: Adam Evans, Steve Loughlin
- Defunct: 2014
- Fate: Acquired by salesforce.com
- Headquarters: Palo Alto, California, United States
- Products: Cloud-Based customer relationship management
- Website: salesforceiq.com

SalesforceIQ (formerly RelateIQ), a subsidiary of Salesforce.com, was an American software company based in Palo Alto, California

Acquired by salesforce.com in 2014 for close to $400 million, the company's product was retired in 2020.

== Technology ==
Unlike traditional relationship management systems, which rely on data input by users to keep their teams informed and run predictive analytics, SalesforceIQ's platform automatically isolates and analyzes a user's professional emails and other interactions. In combining this data with information gleaned from other sources, such as LinkedIn and Facebook, SalesforceIQ leverages data science "to comb through emails, analyze them, and offer reminders and suggestions to busy salespeople."

In March 2014, the company released "Closest Connections", a feature that "automates a normally time-consuming—and potentially erroneous—sales process" by identifying warm introductions for potential prospects based on real activity happening within a team's email inboxes, phones, calendars, and social networks.

== History ==
The company was founded in July 2011 by Adam Evans and Steve Loughlin. At the end of July 2013, the company hired data scientist DJ Patil as VP of Product.

As part of the 2015 Dreamforce conference, RelateIQ was rebranded as SalesforceIQ.

On March 13, 2020, the SalesforceIQ product was retired.
