= TiE =

American non-profit organization

The IndUS Entrepreneurs (TiE) is a non-profit organization with a mission to foster entrepreneurship through mentoring, networking, education, funding and incubation. With a focus of giving back to the community, TiE’s focus is on generating and nurturing the next generation of Entrepreneurs. By 2000, TiE-inspired startups had helped create new businesses worth more than US$50 billion in market capitalization, a number that is likely over US$100 billion by 2022. Founded in 1992 by a group of Indian American entrepreneurs, the organization has expanded to 60 chapters worldwide. It also hosts the annual TiEcon conference. The founding chapter, TiE Silicon Valley, remains the largest.

== History ==
TiE as an idea emerged from a chance meeting at the Santa Clara Marriott in December, 1992, that was being hosted by a group of Indian American entrepreneurs and executives for a visit by an Indian Government official. A group of seven individuals, led by Ambrish "A.J." Patel (who had proposed the idea of getting together regularly to network and support entrepreneurship), Narpat Bhandari, Kailash Joshi, Roy Prasad, Sam Sathya, Bipin Shah, and Ray Vrudhula formed an ad hoc committee to develop the idea of TiE and create an organization, which they did. Two years later, in December 1994, TiE was established as a formal, not-for-profit organization to foster entrepreneurship and networking. A group of 17 Charter Members formed the foundation of the organization, with Suhas Patil, ex-MIT professor and founder of Cirrus Logic as President, and Kanwal Rekhi, ex-Novell EVP and angel investor, who would be named President Elect. What was all of TiE back then continues to operate as TiE Silicon Valley now, one of some 60 chapters around the world today, with a virtual umbrella entity named TiE Global that oversees all the chapters.

== Organization ==
Since starting as a single organization called TiE in Silicon Valley, TiE has expanded to 60 chapters in 17 countries, with each chapter identified by the name TiE and the location of the chapter. The chapters are autonomous entities, modeled after the original TiE Silicon Valley chapter, and all the chapters are governed by TiE Global. Each chapter has its own charter members comprising veteran entrepreneurs and executives, and members who are typically aspiring entrepreneurs.

== TiECon ==
In 1994, TiE organized a 2-day entrepreneurs seminar and workshop in San Jose, California. This event was a brainchild of Suhas Patil, and it was a huge success, attended by 500 aspiring entrepreneurs, corporate executives, venture capital investors, faculty members from Stanford and Berkeley, and representatives of other organizations that service startup companies, such as accounting firms and law firms. This event put TiE on the map in Silicon Valley and TiE instantly became recognized by sponsors as a unique organization that deserved to be supported. The 1995 version of it was named TiEcon by Charter Member Parveen Gupta. Since then, TiEcon has been the flagship TiE event. Several other TiE chapters have often used the TiEcon name for local conferences and workshops on a smaller scale. The main TiEcon is the one that typically happens during the month of May in Santa Clara / San Jose, California, and organized by TiE Silicon Valley.

== TiE Silicon Valley ==
TiE Silicon Valley (TiE SV) is the largest and founding chapter of the TiE brand. The chapter provides technology entrepreneurs with mentoring services, networking opportunities, startup-related education, funding, and incubating.

=== History ===
TiE SV was founded in 1992 by a group of entrepreneurs, corporate executives, and senior professionals with roots in the South Asian or Indus region. It was named TiE for "The Indus Entrepreneurs." By 2011 it had moved away from that focus to be open and inclusive.

In 2023, TiE signed a memorandum of understanding with the Indian government, specifically its Software Technology Parks of India, to create interaction between Silicon Valley investors and Indian startups.

At the start of 2025, Murali Bukkapatnam was elected chair of the TiE Global Board of Trustees. Anita Manwani was named vice chair. At the time, TiE claimed 10,000 members in 15 countries. In 2025, TiEcon's president and chair was Anita Manwani. The organization stated it had "impacted" over 25,000 startups, and that it had "helped create more than two million jobs."

=== Organization ===
TiE SV is a network of general members, Charter Members, and sponsors. Charter members are veteran entrepreneurs who assist younger entrepreneurs with time, knowledge, and resources. This membership level is by invitation only.

=== Programs ===
==== TiEcon ====
TiEcon is TiE SV's flagship annual conference. Since 2008, around 4,000 people attend the conference from over 40 countries, and in 2014 it was widely considered the world's largest conference for entrepreneurs. The conference features two days of networking and programming. Also, at each TiEcon, the world's 50 most promising technology startups are honored as the "TiE50," selected from 1,600 companies screened worldwide. At TiEcon 2011, Cloudera was announced as a TiE50 winner in the software/cloud computing category. As of 2011, 94% of TiE50 companies had been funded, attracting $20 billion in funding. TiEcon was listed by Worth Magazine in their September 2011 issue to be among the 10 Best Conferences for Ideas and Entrepreneurship.

The Santa Cruz TiECon event had 4,000 attendees in 2016. Tim Draper delivered the keynote speech at the 25th anniversary of TiE Silicon Valley at TiEcon 2017 in Santa Clara. According to the American Bazaar, conference passes at that time cost between $300 and $550 USD.

In 2024, TiECON Chandigarh showcased 70 startups at the Hyatt Regency in Chandigarh, India. The tenth edition of TiECON Chandigarh was held in March 2025.

The April to May 2025 flagship TiEcon conference, at Santa Clara Convention Center, was scheduled for 3,000 attendees, 150 speakers, and 50 sponsors, with an AI theme. Among keynote speakers were Satya Nadella, Microsoft CEO, and other CEOs such as Shantanu Narayen, Lip-Bu Tan, and Vivek Ranadive. At TiEcon 2025, TiE Silicon Valley gave Nadella a Lifetime Achievement Award.

==== TiE Angels ====
TiE Angels is an early stage Angel investment group formed in 2010 by Charter Members of TiE SV. There are about 100 investors that invest through TiE Angels. There is no TiE SV fund and individuals invest in their personal capacity. TiE Angels was ranked by CB Insights as one of the Top 20 Angel groups in the nation in August 2014.

Most of TiE Angels investments are under $1 million. In its first year of existence, TiE Angels invested in 11 companies with a total of about $4.5 million. CloudVolumes, which was purchased by VMware in August 2014, was backed by TiE Angels and several individual Angel investors. TiE Angels also backed CRISI Medical which was acquired by BD Medical in March 2015.

==== TiE LaunchPad ====
TiE LaunchPad is TiE SV's accelerator program for early stage startups. LaunchPad accepts eight companies per batch, and startups are seeded with $50,000 in convertible notes and offered optional working space, infrastructure, and additional support services for a five month duration. Companies also get assistance in fundraising by presenting to TiE's network of investors at a Demo Day at the end of the program. More than 50 charter members serve as mentors to LaunchPad companies.

==== Billion Dollar Babies ====
The Billion Dollar Babies Program is an initiative through TiE SV to mentor product companies out of India who are achieving significant domestic traction and wish to scale their products globally. It is managed by BV Jagadeesh, Raju Reddy (founder of Sierra Atlantic), and TiE SV President Venktesh Shukla. The pilot round of this program began January 2015.

== Board of Trustees (2025) ==
The following individuals serve as the Board of Trustees for TiE Global in 2025:

#	Name	Designation	TiE Chapter
1	Murali Bukkapatnam	Chair - TiE Global	TiE Hyderabad
2	Anita Manwani	Vice Chair - TiE Global	TiE Silicon Valley
3	Amit Mookim	Global Trustee	TiE Mumbai
4	Alok Mittal	Global Trustee	TiE Delhi NCR
5	Dharti Arvind Desai	Global Trustee	TiE New York
6	Jatin Trivedi	Global Trustee	TiE Ahmedabad
7	Kevin S. Parikh	Global Trustee	TiE SouthCoast
8	Kiran Deshpande	Global Trustee	TiE Pune
9	Madan Padaki	Global Trustee	TiE Bangalore
10	Sheenu Jhawar	Global Trustee	TiE Rajasthan
11	Yash Shah	Global Trustee	TiE Boston
