= Deadlock (computer science) =

State in which members are blocking each other

Both processes need resources to continue execution. P1 requires additional resource R1 and is in possession of resource R2, P2 requires additional resource R2 and is in possession of R1; neither process can continue.

Four processes (blue lines) compete for one resource (grey circle), following a right-before-left policy. A deadlock occurs when all processes lock the resource simultaneously (black lines). The deadlock can be resolved by breaking the symmetry.

In concurrent computing, deadlock is any situation in which no member of some group of entities can proceed because each waits for another member, including itself, to take action, such as sending a message or, more commonly, releasing a lock. Deadlocks are a common problem in multiprocessing systems, parallel computing, and distributed systems, because in these contexts systems often use software or hardware locks to arbitrate shared resources and implement process synchronization.

In an operating system, a deadlock occurs when a process or thread enters a waiting state because a requested system resource is held by another waiting process, which in turn is waiting for another resource held by another waiting process. If a process remains indefinitely unable to change its state because resources requested by it are being used by another process that itself is waiting, then the system is said to be in a deadlock.

In a communications system, deadlocks occur mainly due to loss or corruption of signals rather than contention for resources.

Two processes competing for two resources in opposite order.: 1. A single process goes through.; 2. The later process has to wait.; 3. A deadlock occurs when the first process locks the first resource at the same time as the second process locks the second resource.; 4. The deadlock can be resolved by cancelling and restarting the first process.

== Conditions ==
A deadlock situation on a resource can arise only if all of the following conditions occur simultaneously in a system:

1. Mutual exclusion: multiple resources are not shareable; only one process at a time may use each resource.
2. Hold and wait or resource holding: a process is currently holding at least one resource and requesting additional resources which are being held by other processes.
3. No preemption: a resource can be released only voluntarily by the process holding it.
4. Circular wait: each process must be waiting for a resource which is being held by another process, which in turn is waiting for the first process to release the resource. In general, there is a set of waiting processes, P = {P_{1}, P_{2}, ..., P_{N}}, such that P_{1} is waiting for a resource held by P_{2}, P_{2} is waiting for a resource held by P_{3} and so on until P_{N} is waiting for a resource held by P_{1}.

These four conditions are known as the Coffman conditions from their first description in a 1971 article by Edward G. Coffman, Jr.

While these conditions are sufficient to produce a deadlock on single-instance resource systems, they only indicate the possibility of deadlock on systems having multiple instances of resources.

== Deadlock handling ==
Most current operating systems cannot prevent deadlocks. When a deadlock occurs, different operating systems respond to them in different non-standard manners. Most approaches work by preventing one of the four Coffman conditions from occurring, especially the fourth one. Major approaches are as follows.

=== Ignoring deadlock ===
In this approach, it is assumed that a deadlock will never occur. This is also an application of the Ostrich algorithm. This approach was initially used by MINIX and UNIX. This is used when the time intervals between occurrences of deadlocks are large and the data loss incurred each time is tolerable.

Ignoring deadlocks can be safely done if deadlocks are formally proven to never occur. An example is the RTIC framework.

=== Detection ===
Under the deadlock detection, deadlocks are allowed to occur. Then the state of the system is examined to detect that a deadlock has occurred and subsequently it is corrected. An algorithm is employed that tracks resource allocation and process states, it rolls back and restarts one or more of the processes in order to remove the detected deadlock. Detecting a deadlock that has already occurred is easily possible since the resources that each process has locked and/or currently requested are known to the resource scheduler of the operating system.

After a deadlock is detected, it can be corrected by using one of the following methods:

1. Process termination: one or more processes involved in the deadlock may be aborted. One could choose to abort all competing processes involved in the deadlock. This ensures that deadlock is resolved with certainty and speed. But the expense is high as partial computations will be lost. Or, one could choose to abort one process at a time until the deadlock is resolved. This approach has a high overhead because after each abort an algorithm must determine whether the system is still in deadlock. Several factors must be considered while choosing a candidate for termination, such as priority and age of the process.
2. Resource preemption: resources allocated to various processes may be successively preempted and allocated to other processes until the deadlock is broken.

=== Prevention ===
(A) Two processes competing for one resource, following a first-come, first-served policy. (B) Deadlock occurs when both processes lock the resource simultaneously. (C) The deadlock can be resolved by breaking the symmetry of the locks. (D) The deadlock can be prevented by breaking the symmetry of the locking mechanism.

Deadlock prevention works by preventing one of the four Coffman conditions from occurring.

- Removing the mutual exclusion condition means that no process will have exclusive access to a resource. This proves impossible for resources that cannot be spooled. But even with spooled resources, the deadlock could still occur. Algorithms that avoid mutual exclusion are called non-blocking synchronization algorithms.
- The hold and wait or resource holding conditions may be removed by requiring processes to request all the resources they will need before starting up (or before embarking upon a particular set of operations). This advance knowledge is frequently difficult to satisfy and, in any case, is an inefficient use of resources. Another way is to require processes to request resources only when it has none; First, they must release all their currently held resources before requesting all the resources they will need from scratch. This too is often impractical. It is so because resources may be allocated and remain unused for long periods. Also, a process requiring a popular resource may have to wait indefinitely, as such a resource may always be allocated to some process, resulting in resource starvation. (These algorithms, such as serializing tokens, are known as the all-or-none algorithms.)
- The no preemption condition may also be difficult or impossible to avoid as a process has to be able to have a resource for a certain amount of time, or the processing outcome may be inconsistent or thrashing may occur. However, the inability to enforce preemption may interfere with a priority algorithm. Preemption of a "locked out" resource generally implies a rollback, and is to be avoided since it is very costly in overhead. Algorithms that allow preemption include lock-free and wait-free algorithms and optimistic concurrency control. If a process holding some resources and requests for some another resource(s) that cannot be immediately allocated to it, the condition may be removed by releasing all the currently being held resources of that process.
- The final condition is the circular wait condition. Approaches that avoid circular waits include disabling interrupts during critical sections and using a hierarchy to determine a partial ordering of resources. If no obvious hierarchy exists, even the memory address of resources has been used to determine ordering and resources are requested in the increasing order of the enumeration. Dijkstra's solution can also be used.

=== Deadlock avoidance ===
Similar to deadlock prevention, deadlock avoidance approach ensures that deadlock will not occur in a system. The term "deadlock avoidance" appears to be very close to "deadlock prevention" in a linguistic context, but they are very much different in the context of deadlock handling. Deadlock avoidance does not impose any conditions as seen in prevention but, here each resource request is carefully analyzed to see whether it could be safely fulfilled without causing deadlock.

Deadlock avoidance requires that the operating system be given in advance additional information concerning which resources a process will request and use during its lifetime. Deadlock avoidance algorithm analyzes each and every request by examining that there is no possibility of deadlock occurrence in the future if the requested resource is allocated. The drawback of this approach is its requirement of information in advance about how resources are to be requested in the future. One of the most used deadlock avoidance algorithms is Banker's algorithm.

== Livelock ==
A livelock is similar to a deadlock, except that the states of the processes involved in the livelock constantly change with regard to one another, none progressing.

The term was coined by Edward A. Ashcroft in a 1975 paper in connection with an examination of airline booking systems. Livelock is a special case of resource starvation; the general definition only states that a specific process is not progressing.

Livelock is a risk with some algorithms that detect and recover from deadlock. If more than one process takes action, the deadlock detection algorithm can be repeatedly triggered. This can be avoided by ensuring that only one process (chosen arbitrarily or by priority) takes action.

== Distributed deadlock ==
Distributed deadlocks can occur in distributed systems when distributed transactions or concurrency control is being used.

Unlike in centralized systems, detecting and resolving distributed deadlocks is more complex due to the lack of shared memory and the need for coordination among nodes. Techniques like wait-for graphs, distributed algorithms (like edge chasing; e.g., Chandy-Misra-Haas), and deadlock prevention (e.g., timeout-based methods) are used to handle such scenarios. The challenge lies in ensuring consistency and avoiding false positives/negatives due to network delays or partial failures.

Phantom deadlocks are deadlocks that are falsely detected in a distributed system due to system internal delays but do not actually exist. For example, if a process releases a resource R1 and issues a request for R2, and the first message is lost or delayed, a coordinator (detector of deadlocks) could falsely conclude a deadlock (if the request for R2 while having R1 would cause a deadlock).

== See also ==
- Aporia
- Banker's algorithm
- Catch-22 (logic)
- Circular reference
- Dining philosophers problem
- File locking
- Gridlock (in vehicular traffic)
- Hang (computing)
- Impasse
- Infinite loop
- Linearizability
- Model checker can be used to formally verify that a system will never enter a deadlock
- Ostrich algorithm
- Priority inversion
- Race condition
- Readers-writer lock
- Sleeping barber problem
- Stalemate
- Synchronization (computer science)
- Turn restriction routing
