= X/Open =

1984–1996 technology consortium

X/Open group (also known as the Open Group for Unix Systems and incorporated in 1987 as X/Open Company, Ltd.) was a consortium founded by several European UNIX systems manufacturers in 1984 to identify and promote open standards in the field of information technology. More specifically, the original aim was to define a single specification for operating systems derived from UNIX, to increase the interoperability of applications and reduce the cost of porting software. Its original members were Bull, ICL, Siemens, Olivetti, and Nixdorf—a group sometimes referred to as BISON. Philips and Ericsson joined in 1985, at which point the name X/Open was adopted.

The group published its specifications as X/Open Portability Guide, starting with Issue 1 in 1985, and later as X/Open CAE Specification.

In 1987, X/Open was incorporated as X/Open Company, Ltd.

By March 1988, X/Open grew to 13 members: AT&T, Digital, Hewlett-Packard, Sun Microsystems, Unisys, NCR, Olivetti, Bull, Ericsson, Nixdorf, Philips, ICL, and Siemens.

By 1990 the group had expanded to 21 members: in addition to the original five, Philips and Nokia from Europe; AT&T, Digital, Unisys, Hewlett-Packard, IBM, NCR, Sun, Prime Computer, Apollo Computer from North America; Fujitsu, Hitachi, and NEC from Japan; plus the Open Software Foundation and Unix International.

In October 1993, a planned transfer of UNIX trademark from Novell to X/Open was announced; it was finalized in 2nd quarter of 1994.

In 1994, X/Open published the Single UNIX Specification, which was drawn from XPG4 Base and other sources.

In 1996, X/Open merged with the Open Software Foundation to form The Open Group.

X/Open was also responsible for the XA protocol for heterogeneous distributed transaction processing, which was released in 1991.

== X/Open Portability Guide ==
X/Open published its specifications under the name X/Open Portability Guide (or XPG). Based on the AT&T System V Interface Definition, the guide has a wider scope than POSIX, which is only concerned with direct operating system interfaces. The guide specifies a Common Application Environment (CAE) intended to allow portability of applications across operating systems. The primary aim was compatibility between different vendors' implementations of UNIX, though some vendors also implemented the standards on non-UNIX platforms.

Issue 1 of the guide covered basic operating system interfaces, the C language, COBOL, indexed sequential file access method (ISAM) and other parts and was published in 1985. Issue 2 followed in 1987, and extended the coverage to include Internationalization, Terminal Interfaces, Inter-Process Communication, and the programming languages C, COBOL, FORTRAN, and Pascal, as well as data access interfaces for SQL and ISAM. In many cases these were profiles of existing international standards. Issue 3 (XPG3) followed in 1989, its primary focus being convergence with the POSIX operating system specifications; it added Window Manager, ADA Language and more. Issue 4 (XPG4) was published in July 1992. The Single UNIX Specification was based on the XPG4 standard. The XPG3 and XPG4 standards define all aspects of the operating system, programming languages and protocols which compliant systems should have.

Multiple levels of compliance and corresponding labels were available, depending on the scope of the guide that was covered: Base and Plus; labels Component and Application are for SW components and applications that make use of the portability guide.

Issue 1 was published as a single publication with multiple parts, ISBN 0-444-87839-4.

Issue 2 was published in multiple volumes:

- X/Open Portability Guide Volume 1: System V Specification Commands and Utilities, 1987, ISBN 0-444-70174-5
- X/Open Portability Guide Volume 2: System V Specification System Calls and Libraries, 1987, ISBN 0-444-70175-3
- X/Open Portability Guide Volume 3: System V Specification Supplementary Definitions, 1987, ISBN 0-444-70176-1
- X/Open Portability Guide Volume 4: Programming Languages, 1987, ISBN 0-444-70179-6
- X/Open Portability Guide Volume 5: Data Management, 1987, ISBN 0-444-70178-8

Issue 3 was published in multiple volumes:

- X/Open Portability Guide Volume 1: XSI Commands and Utilities, 1989, ISBN 0-13-685835-X
- X/Open Portability Guide Volume 2: XSI System Interface and Headers, 1989, ISBN 0-13-685843-0
- X/Open Portability Guide Volume 3: XSI Supplementary Definitions, 1989, ISBN 0-13-685850-3
- X/Open Portability Guide Volume 4: Programming Languages, 1988, ISBN 0-13-685868-6
- X/Open Portability Guide Volume 5: Data Management, 1988, ISBN 0-13-685876-7
- X/Open Portability Guide Volume 6: Window Management, 1988, ISBN 0-13-685884-8
- X/Open Portability Guide Volume 7: Networking Services, 1988, ISBN 0-13-685892-9

The XPG4 Base specification includes the following documents:

- System Interfaces and Headers (XSH), Issue 4, 1992, ISBN 1-872630-47-2, C202
- Commands and Utilities (XCU), Issue 4, 1992, ISBN 1-872630-48-0, C203
- System Interface Definitions (XBD), Issue 4, 1992, ISBN 1-872630-46-4, C204

The above three documents were published not under the label X/Open Portability Guide but rather as CAE Specification. Nonetheless, the term X/Open Portability Guide, Issue 4 sees some use in reference to 1992 year of publication.

Further X/Open publications under the label X/Open CAE Specification rather than X/Open Portability Guide:

- Distributed Transaction Processing: The XA Specification, December 1991, ISBN 1-872630-24-3
- Systems Management: Management Protocol Profiles (XMPP), October 1993, ISBN 1-85912-018-0
- X/Open DCE: Remote Procedure Call, August 1994, ISBN 1-85912-041-5
- System Interface Definitions, Issue 4, Version 2, September 1994, ISBN 1-85912-036-9
- System Interfaces and Headers, Issue 4, Version 2, September 1994, ISBN 1-85912-037-7
- Commands and Utilities, Issue 4, Version 2, September 1994, ISBN 1-85912-034-2
- Networking Services, Issue 4, September 1994, ISBN 1-85912-049-0
- Data Management:SQL Call Level Interface (CLI), March 1995, ISBN 1-85912-081-4
- File System Safe UCS Transformation Format (UTF-8), March 1995, ISBN 1-85912-082-2
- Distributed Transaction Processing: The TX (Transaction Demarcation) Specification, April 1995, ISBN 1-85912-094-6
- X.25 Programming Interface using XTI (XX25), November 1995, ISBN 1-85912-136-5
- Distributed Transaction Processing: The TxRPC Specification, November 1995, ISBN 1-85912-115-2
- Distributed Transaction Processing: The XATMI Specification, November 1995, ISBN 1-85912-130-6
- Distributed Transaction Processing: The XCPI-C Specification Version 2, November 1995, ISBN 1-85912-135-7
- X/Open Curses, Issue 4, 1995, ISBN 9781859120774
- X/Open Curses, Issue 4, Version 2, 1996, ISBN 1-85912-171-3
- Data Management: Structured Query Language (SQL) Version 2, March 1996, ISBN 1-85912-151-9

== See also ==
- Joint Inter-Domain Management
