= Future Airborne Capability Environment =

Open avionics standard

The Open Group Future Airborne Capability Environment (FACE Consortium) was formed in 2010 to define an open avionics environment for all military airborne platform types. Today, it is a real-time software-focused professional group made up of industry suppliers, customers, academia, and users. The FACE approach is a government-industry software standard and business strategy for acquisition of affordable software systems that promotes innovation and rapid integration of portable capabilities across programs. The FACE Consortium provides a vendor-neutral forum for industry and government to work together to develop and consolidate the open standards, best practices, guidance documents, and business strategy necessary to result in:

- Standardized approaches for using open standards within avionics systems
- Lower implementation costs of FACE systems
- Standards that support a robust architecture and enable quality software development
- The use of standard interfaces that will lead to reuse of capabilities
- Portability of applications across multiple FACE systems and vendors
- Procurement of FACE conformant products
- More capabilities reaching the customer faster
- Innovation and competition within the avionics industry

The FACE Technical Standard is an open real-time standard for making safety-critical computing operations more robust, interoperable, portable and secure. Although the consortium started with a focus on avionics, the applicability of the technical standard and its associated data model have become much broader. The standard enables software developers to create and deploy a wide catalog of applications for use across the entire spectrum of real-time systems through a common operating environment. The latest edition of the standard further promotes application interoperability and portability with enhanced requirements for exchanging data among FACE components, including a formally specified data model, and emphasis on defining common language requirements for the standard.

== Membership ==
Until 2022, individual members were required to be US persons. In 2022, the consortium moved to open membership to the countries of Canada, Australia, New Zealand, the United Kingdom, and the United States. Individuals can only become members if they are employed by a company that is a member.

Corporate membership is at different levels. The sponsor-level members are Boeing, Collins Aerospace, Lockheed Martin, US Air Force LCMC, and US Army PEO Aviation, and US Naval Air Systems Command.

== Background ==
The FACE effort sprang from US Navy open architecture programs, promoted by the US Naval Air Systems Command (NAVAIR), to enhance interoperability and software portability for avionics software applications across DoD aviation platforms. Both the US Army and US Air Force have been participating in the consortium. NAVAIR led the pack with early acquisitions, followed later by Army and Air Force.

The FACE Consortium was formed by The Open Group as a "Voluntary Consensus Standards Body", as defined by the National Technology Transfer Act and OMB Circular A-119. This facilitates government participation in the consortium. One goal of the effort is to reduce the typical development and deployment cycle of new capabilities in military airborne platforms from as long as six years under the current methodology to as little as six months.

The FACE reference architecture ecosystem includes software product conformance verification and certification processes. In October 2016, a suite of flight management software earned the first FACE certificate of conformance. One may view information on all certified FACE conformant products at the FACE Registry

== Technical approach ==
The FACE technical approach tackles barriers to software modularity, portability, and interoperability by defining a Reference Architecture and employing design principles to enhance software portability. To meet the objectives of the technical approach, the FACE Technical Standard uses a standardized architecture describing a conceptual breakdown of functionality, called the FACE Reference Architecture, to promote the reuse of software components able to share common functionality across disparate systems. This architecture defines standardized interfaces to allow software components to be moved between systems, including those developed by different vendors. The standardized interfaces follow a data architecture to ensure the data communicated between the software components is fully described to facilitate their integration on new systems.

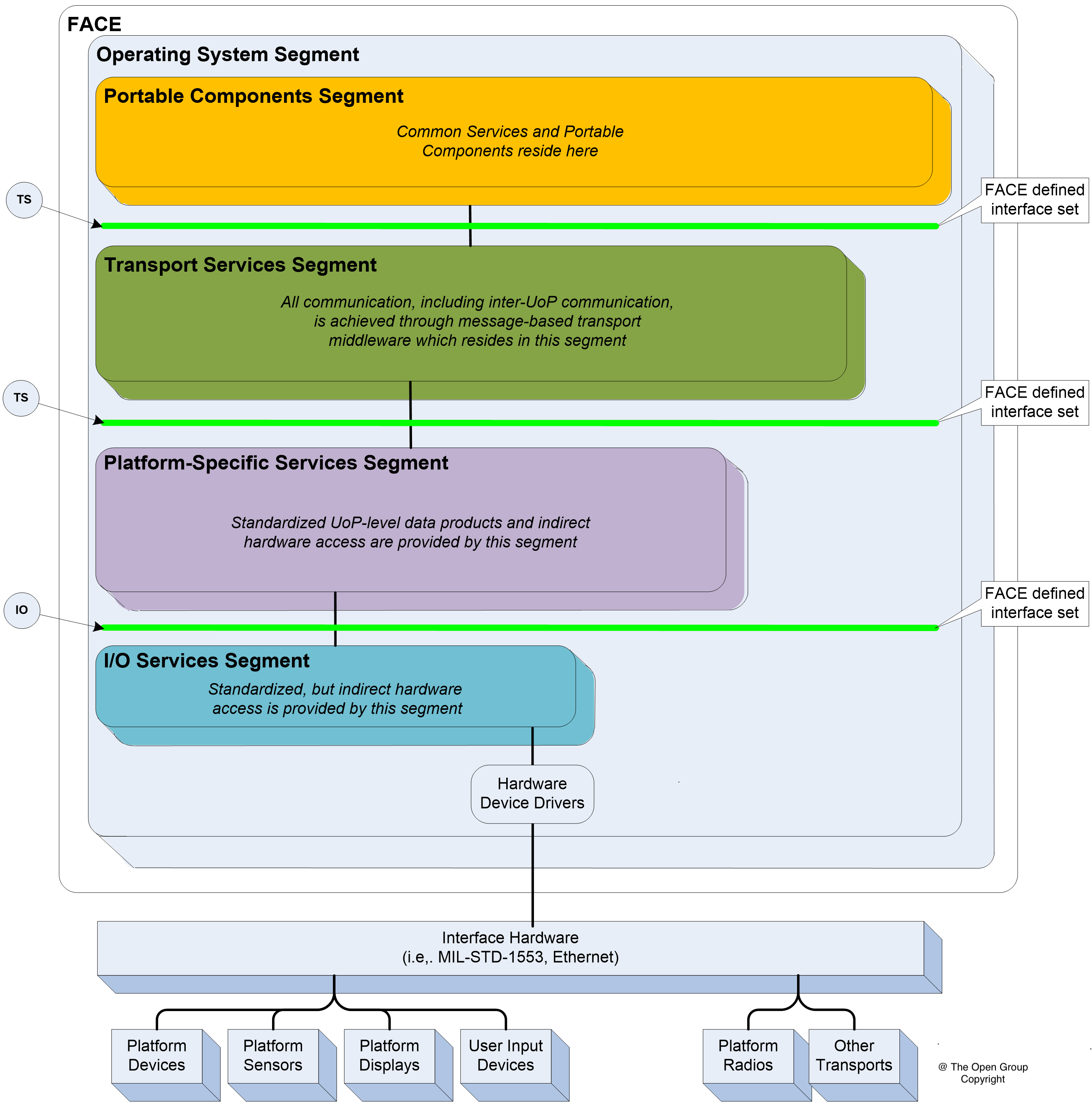
FACE Reference Architecture

The FACE Reference Architecture is composed of logical segments where variance occurs. The structure created by connecting these segments together is the foundation of the FACE Reference Architecture. The five (5) segments of the FACE Reference Architecture are the Operating System Segment (OSS), Input/Output Services Segment (IOSS), Platform-Specific Services Segment (PSSS), Transport Services Segment (TSS), and Portable Components Segment (PCS).

The FACE Reference Architecture defines a set of standardized interfaces providing connections between the FACE architectural segments. The standardized interfaces within the FACE Reference Architecture are the Operating System Segment Interface (OSS Interface), the Input/Output Services Interface (IOS Interface), the Transport Services Interfaces, and Component-Oriented Support Interfaces.

The FACE Reference Architecture defines three FACE OSS Profiles tailoring the Operating System (OS) Application Programming Interfaces (APIs), programming languages, programming language features, run-times, frameworks, and graphics capabilities to meet the requirements of software components for differing levels of criticality. The three Profiles are Security, Safety, and General Purpose. The Security Profile constrains the OS APIs to a minimal useful set allowing assessment for high-assurance security functions executing as a single process. The Safety Profile is less restrictive than the Security Profile and constrains the OS APIs to those that have a safety certification pedigree. The General Purpose Profile is the least constrained profile and supports OS APIs meeting real-time deterministic or non-real-time, non-deterministic requirements depending on the system or subsystem implementation.

The FACE Data Architecture defines the FACE Data Model Language (including the language binding specification), Query and Template language, FACE Shared Data Model (SDM) and the rules of construction of the Unit of Portability (UoP) Supplied Model (USM). Each PCS Unit of Conformance (UoC), PSSS UoC, or TSS UoC providing using TS Interfaces is accompanied by a USM consistent with the FACE SDM and defines its interfaces in terms of the FACE Data Model Language. A Domain-Specific Data Model (DSDM) captures content relevant to a domain of interest and can be used as a basis for USMs.
