= Joint Inter-Domain Management =

Joint Inter-Domain Management (JIDM) task force, jointly sponsored by X/Open and the Network Management Forum, has defined a mapping between SNMP, CMIP and CORBA. The JIDM specification was adopted as a standard by the Open Group in 2000.

The mapping specification is in two parts: the Specification Translation and the Interactive Translation. The Specification Translation spells out translation of the object oriented object models among the network management protocols that allow for data transfer across protocols. The Interactive Translation concerns the dynamic translation of objects in use that allows for the construction of network management software that operates across protocols.

The JIDM specification was considered the most significant work to use the CORBA framework in network management mapping. The JIDM specification led to CORBA's further use in specifications in the telecommunications industry, such as the ITU-T GDMO specifications. But the object framework led to performance problems, such as requiring a remote method invocation for each object attribute and scalability problems coming from large numbers of objects generated from all the network connections. This led to network management data mapping approaches where sets of attributes and lists of connections were transferred instead of individual objects.
