= Unix International =

Association created during the Unix wars to counterbalance the Open Software Foundation

Unix International (UI) was an association created in 1988 to promote open standards, especially the Unix operating system. Its most notable members were AT&T and Sun Microsystems, and in fact the commonly accepted reason for its existence was as a counterbalance to the Open Software Foundation (OSF), itself created in response to AT&T's and Sun's Unix partnership of that time. UI and OSF thus represented the two sides of the Unix wars in the late 1980s and early 1990s.

In May 1993, the major members of both UI and OSF announced the Common Open Software Environment (COSE) initiative. This was followed by the merging of UI and OSF into a "new OSF" in March 1994, which in turn merged with X/Open in 1996, forming The Open Group.
