= X/Open XA =

Distributed transaction processing standard

For transaction processing in computing, the X/Open XA standard (short for "eXtended Architecture") is a specification released in 1991 by X/Open (which later merged with The Open Group) for distributed transaction processing (DTP).

== Goals ==
The goal of XA is to guarantee atomicity in "global transactions" that are executed across heterogeneous components. A transaction is a unit of work such as transferring money from one person to another. Distributed transactions update multiple data stores (such as databases, application servers, message queues, transactional caches, etc.). To guarantee integrity, XA uses a two-phase commit (2PC) to ensure that all of a transaction's changes either take effect (commit) or do not (roll back), i.e., atomically.

== Architecture ==
Specifically, XA describes the interface between a global transaction manager and a specific application. An application that wants to use XA engages an XA transaction manager using a library or separate service. The transaction manager tracks the participants in the transaction (i.e. the various data stores to which the application writes), and works with them to carry out the two-phase commit. In other words, the XA transaction manager is separate from an application's interactions with servers. XA maintains a log of its decisions to commit or roll back, which it can use to recover in case of a system outage.

Many software vendors support XA (meaning the software can participate in XA transactions), including a variety of relational databases and message brokers.

== Advantages and disadvantages ==
Since XA uses two-phase commit, the advantages and disadvantages of that protocol generally apply to XA. The main advantage is that XA (using 2PC) allows an atomic transaction across multiple heterogeneous technologies (e.g. a single transaction could encompass multiple databases from different vendors as well as an email server and a message broker), whereas traditional database transactions are limited to a single database.

The main disadvantage is that 2PC is a blocking protocol: the other servers need to wait for the transaction manager to issue a decision about whether to commit or abort each transaction. If the transaction manager goes offline while transactions are waiting for its final decision, they will be stuck and hold their database locks until the transaction manager comes online again and issues its decision. This extended holding of locks may be disruptive to other applications that are using the same databases.

Moreover, if the transaction manager crashes and its record of decisions cannot be recovered (e.g. due to a bug in how the decisions were logged, or due to data corruption on the server), manual intervention may be necessary. Many XA implementations provide an "escape hatch" for transactions to independently decide whether to commit or abort (without waiting to hear from the transaction manager), but this risks violating the atomicity guarantee and is therefore reserved for emergencies.

== Specification ==
The XA specification describes what a resource manager must do to support transactional access. Resource managers that follow this specification are said to be XA-compliant.

The XA specification was based on an interface used in the Tuxedo system developed in the 1980s, but adopted by several systems since then.

== See also ==
- Two-phase commit protocol
- Distributed Relational Database Architecture (DRDA)
