= Rosemary Roberts =

American statistics educator

- Education: University of Reading; University of Waterloo
- Scientific career
- Fields: Statistics
- Workplaces: Bowdoin College

Rosemary A. Roberts is a statistics educator who led the creation of the AP Statistics course and exam for US secondary school students, and who later chaired the Statistical Education Section of the American Statistical Association. Educated in England and Canada, she spent many years working in the US before her 2013 retirement.

Roberts earned a bachelor's degree in England, at the University of Reading. She completed her Ph.D. in statistics at the University of Waterloo. Among her early works, she co-authored the Chang and Roberts algorithm in 1979. She joined the mathematics department at Bowdoin College in 1984, retired in 2013, and is now a professor emeritus there.

In 1987, with Tom Moore of Grinnell College, she co-founded the Statistics in the Liberal Arts Workshop (SLAW), an annual meeting of statisticians at liberal arts colleges held every summer at Grinnell. With Ann E. Watkins, Chris Olsen, and Richard Scheaffer, She is the coauthor of The Teacher's Guide for AP Statistics (The College Board, 1997).

Roberts was elected as a Fellow of the American Statistical Association in 1997.
