= Open Software Foundation =

Nonprofit foundation

The Open Software Foundation, Inc. (OSF) was a not-for-profit industry consortium for creating an open standard for an implementation of the operating system Unix. It was formed in 1988 and merged with X/Open in 1996, to become The Open Group.

Despite the similarities in name, OSF was unrelated to the Free Software Foundation (FSF), or the Open Source Initiative (OSI).

== History ==
The organization was first proposed by Armando Stettner of Digital Equipment Corporation (DEC) at an invitation-only meeting hosted by DEC for several Unix system vendors in January 1988 (called the "Hamilton Group", since the meeting was held at DEC's offices on Palo Alto's Hamilton Avenue). It was intended as an organization for joint development, mostly in response to a perceived threat of "merged UNIX system" efforts by AT&T Corporation and Sun Microsystems. After discussion during the meeting, the proposal was tabled so that members of the Hamilton Group could broach the idea of a joint development effort with Sun and AT&T. In the meantime, Stettner was asked to write an organization charter. That charter was formally presented to Apollo, HP, IBM and others after Sun and AT&T rejected the overture by the Hamilton Group members.

The foundation's original sponsoring members were Apollo Computer, Groupe Bull, Digital Equipment Corporation, Hewlett-Packard, IBM, Nixdorf Computer and Siemens, sometimes called the "Gang of Seven". Later sponsor members included Philips and Hitachi with the broader general membership growing to more than a hundred companies. It was registered under the U.S. National Cooperative Research Act of 1984, which reduces potential antitrust liabilities of research joint ventures and standards development organizations.

The sponsors gave OSF significant funding, a broad mandate (the so-called "Seven Principles"), substantial independence, and support from sponsor senior management. Senior operating executives from the sponsoring companies served on OSF's initial Board of Directors. One of the Seven Principles was declaration of an "Open Process" whereby OSF staff would create Request for Proposals for source technologies to be selected by OSF, in a vendor neutral process. The selected technology would be licensed by the OSF to the public. Membership in the organization gave member companies a voice in the process for requirements. At the founding, five Open Process projects were named.

The organization was seen as a response to the collaboration between AT&T and Sun on UNIX System V Release 4, and a fear that other vendors would be locked out of the standardization process. This led Scott McNealy of Sun to quip that "OSF" really stood for "Oppose Sun Forever". The competition between the opposing versions of Unix systems became known as the Unix wars. AT&T founded the Unix International (UI) project management organization later that year as a counter-response to the OSF. UI was led by Peter Cunningham, formerly of International Computers Limited (ICL), as its president. UI had many of the same characteristics of OSF, with the exception of a software development staff. Unix System Laboratories (USL) filled the software development role, and UI was based in Parsippany-Troy Hills, New Jersey to be close to USL.

The executive staff of the Open Software Foundation included David Tory, President, formerly of Computer Associates; Norma Clarke, Vice-President Human Resources formerly of Mitre; Marty Ford, Vice-President Finance, formerly of DEC; Ira Goldstein, Vice-President Research Institute, formerly of Hewlett-Packard; Roger Gourd, Vice-President Engineering, formerly of DEC; Alex Morrow, Vice-President Strategy, formerly of IBM; Donal O'Shea, Vice-President of Operations, formerly of UniSoft. This staff added more than 300 employees in less than two years. The organization's headquarters were at 11 Cambridge Center in Cambridge, Massachusetts, intentionally located in the neighborhood of the Massachusetts Institute of Technology along with remote development offices in Munich, Germany and Grenoble, France and field offices in Brussels and Tokyo. To the public, the organization appeared to be nothing more than an advocacy group; in reality it included a distributed software development organization.

An independent security software company - Addamax, filed suit in 1990 against OSF and its sponsors charging that OSF was engaged in anticompetitive practices. The court delivered a grant of summary judgment to OSF (152 F.3d 48, 50 (1st Cir.1998). In a related action in 1991, the Federal Trade Commission investigated OSF for allegedly using "unfair trade practices" in its "process for acquiring technology."

== Products ==
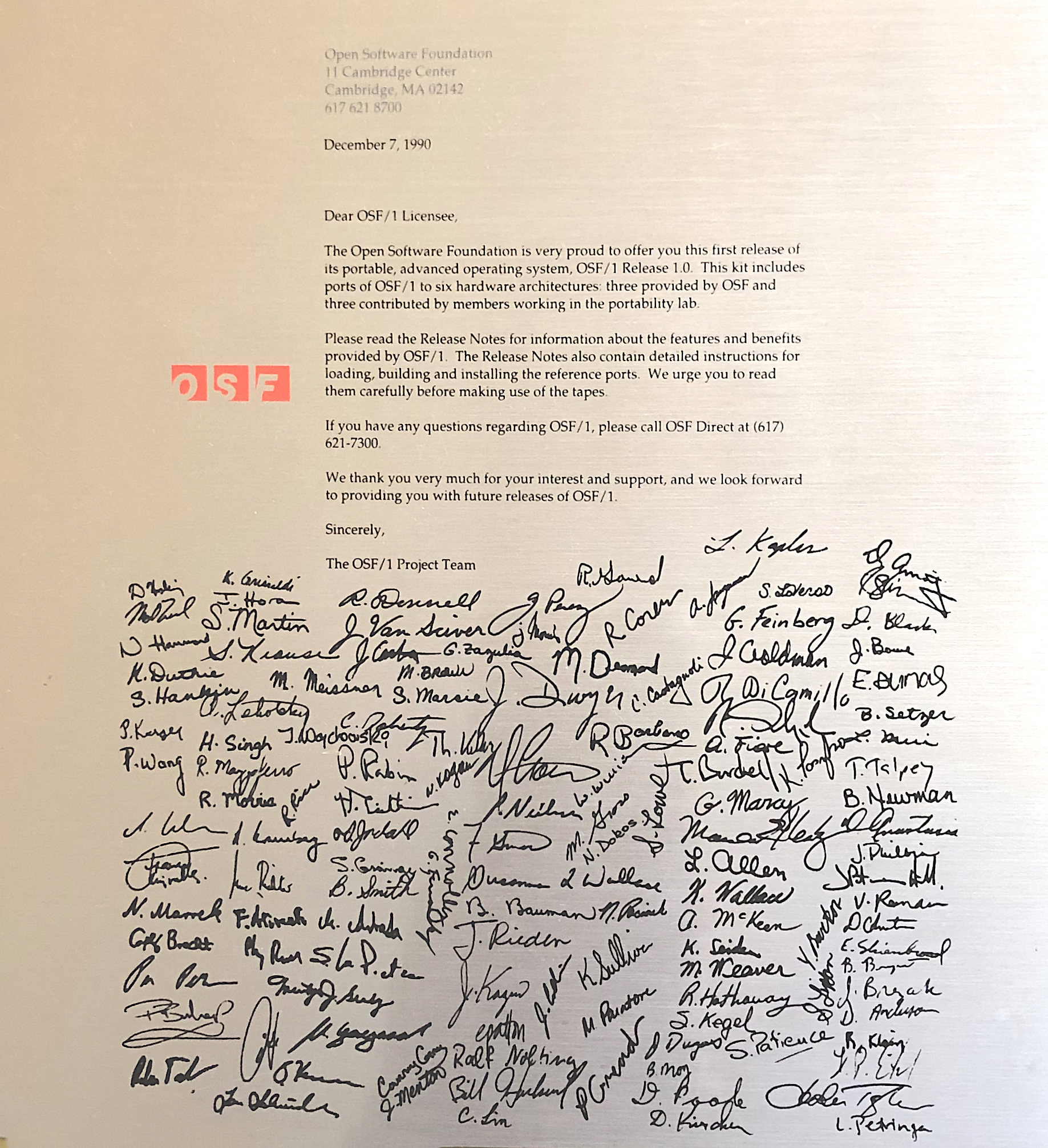
Open Software Foundation OSF/1 Release Letter December 7, 1990

OSF's Unix reference implementation was named OSF/1. It was first released in December 1990 and adopted by Digital a month later. As part of the founding of the organization, the AIX operating system was provided by IBM and was intended to be passed-through to the member companies of OSF. However, delays and portability concerns caused the OSF staff to cancel the original plan. Instead, a new Unix reference operating system using components from across the industry would be released on a wide range of platforms to demonstrate its portability and vendor neutrality. This new OS was produced in a little more than one year. It incorporated technology from Carnegie Mellon University: the Mach 2.5 microkernel; from IBM, the journaled file system and commands and libraries; from SecureWare secure core components; from Berkeley Software Distribution (BSD) the computer networking stack; and a new virtual memory management system invented at OSF. By the time OSF stopped development of OSF/1 in 1996, the only major Unix system vendor using the complete OSF/1 package was Digital (DEC), which rebranded it Digital UNIX (later renamed Tru64 UNIX after Digital's acquisition by Compaq). However, other Unix vendors licensed the operating system to include various components of OSF/1 in their products. Other software vendors also licensed OSF/1 including Apple. Parts of OSF/1 were contained in so many versions of Unix that it may have been the most widely deployed Unix product ever produced.

Other technologies developed by OSF include Motif and Distributed Computing Environment (DCE), respectively a widget toolkit and package of distributed network computing technologies. The Motif toolkit was adopted as a formal standard within the Institute of Electrical and Electronics Engineers (IEEE) as P1295 in 1994.

Filling out the initial (and what turned out to be final) five technologies from OSF were DME, the Distributed Management Environment and ANDF, the Architecturally Neutral Distribution Format. Technologies which were produced primarily by OSF included ODE, the Open Development Environment - a flexible development, build and source control environment; TET, the Test Environment Toolkit - an open framework for building and executing automated test cases; and the operating system OSF/1 MK from the OSF Research Institute based on the Mach3.0 microkernel. ODE and TET were made available as open source. TET was produced as a result of collaboration between OSF, UNIX International and the X/Open Consortium. All the OSF technologies had corresponding manuals and supporting publications produced almost exclusively by the staff at OSF and published by Prentice-Hall. IBM has published its version of ODE on GitHub.

== Merger ==
By 1993, it had become clear that the greater threat to UNIX system vendors was not each other as much as the increasing presence of Microsoft in enterprise computing. In May, the Common Open Software Environment (COSE) initiative was announced by the major players in the UNIX world from both the UI and OSF camps: Hewlett-Packard, IBM, Sun, Unix System Laboratories, and the Santa Cruz Operation. As part of this agreement, Sun and AT&T became OSF sponsor members, OSF submitted Motif to the X/Open Consortium for certification and branding and Novell passed control and licensing of the UNIX trademark to the X/Open Consortium.

In March 1994, OSF announced its new organizational model and introduced the COSE technology model as its Pre-Structured Technology (PST) process, which marked the end of OSF as a significant software development company. It also assumed responsibility for future work on the COSE initiative's Common Desktop Environment (CDE). In September 1995, the merger of OSF/Motif and CDE into a single project, CDE/Motif, was announced.

In February 1996 OSF merged with X/Open to become The Open Group.
