= Oracle Exalogic =

Computer appliance by Oracle Corporation

Exalogic is a computer appliance made by Oracle Corporation, commercially available since 2010. It is a cluster of x86-64-servers running Oracle Linux or Solaris preinstalled.

Its full trade mark is Oracle Exalogic Elastic Cloud (derived from the SI prefix exa- and -logic, probably from Weblogic), positioned by the vendor as a preconfigured clustered application server to use for cloud computing with elastic computing abilities.

== History ==
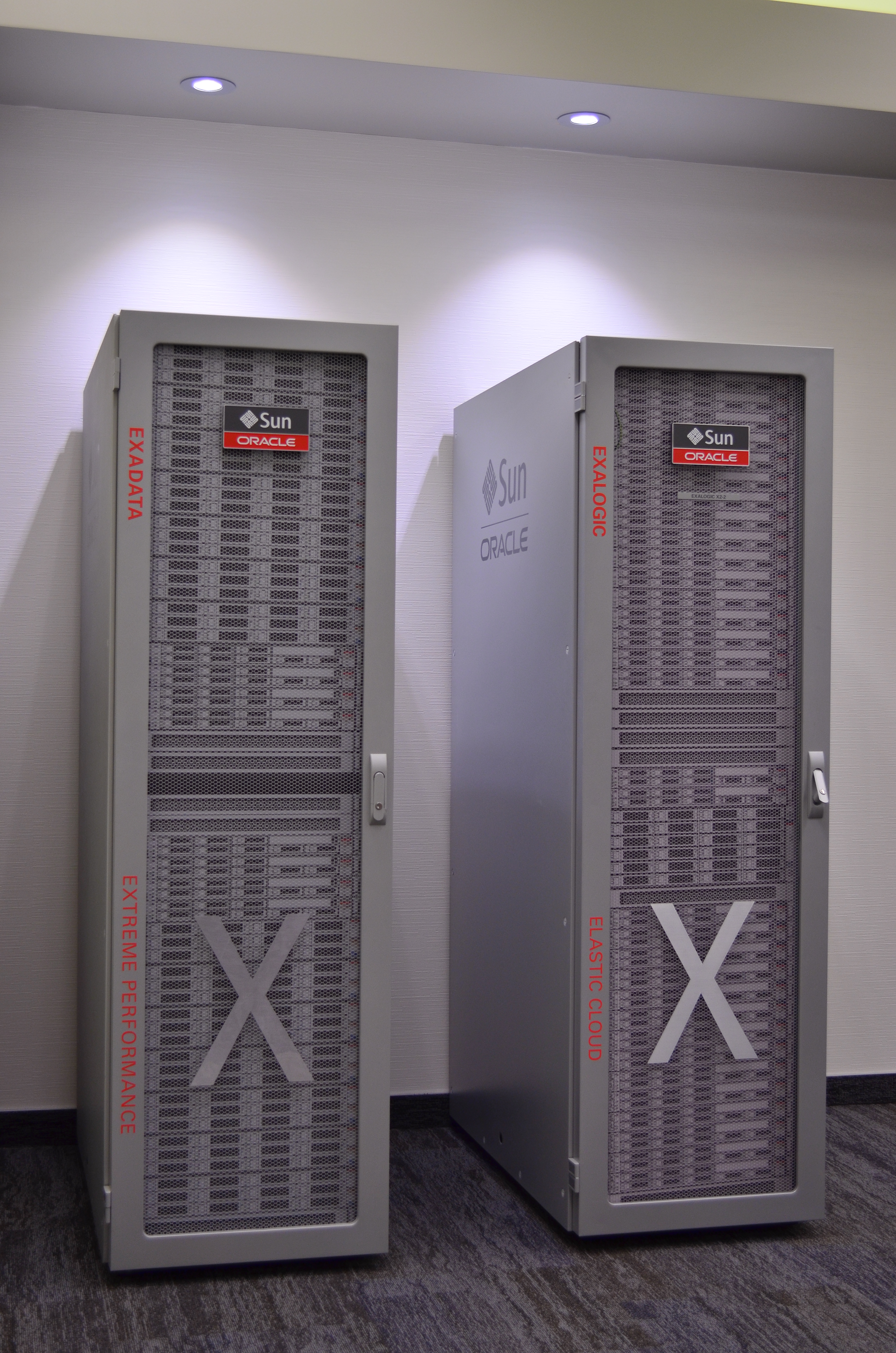
Oracle Exadata and Exalogic

Oracle Corporation announced Exalogic at the Oracle OpenWorld conference in San Francisco in September 2010. The company presented it as a continuation of the Oracle-engineered systems product-line which had started in 2008 with Exadata (preconfigured database cluster).

Exalogic is a factory assembled 19-inch rack of 42 rack units, completed with servers and network equipment. There are 4 configurations, at different prices, depending on what fills the rack. The weight of the full rack is about 1 ton (more than 2000 lbs), a quarter rack weighs half as much.

== Hardware ==
The hardware component of the X2-2 appliance consisted of: a group of 1-unit Intel Xeon servers, each equipped with two six-core 2.93 GHz processors and two solid-state drives for operating system and swap space; a common storage area network; and a set of InfiniBand and Ethernet switches. A full rack contains 30 server nodes, a half rack, 16, a quarter rack, 8, and an eighth rack, 4. Each server node has installed 96 GB of RAM, four 10 Gigabit Ethernet interfaces, and a double InfiniBand port. The storage area network for all configurations is similar, with 40 TB of raw space. The vendor's specifications and advertising content usually indicate the total parameters (360 processor kernels and 2.9 TB RAM for full rack). An X3-2 model was announced in 2012 with newer processors and more memory. Since late 2013 an X4-2 model is commercially available, it has yet more processor cores and four times as large capacity of solid-state drives.
The latest version of Exalogic compute nodes have two Intel E5-2699v3 2.3 GHz Xeon (18-core) processors and eight 32 GB DDR4 2133 MHz RAM for a total of 256 GB per node. Two 400 GB SSDs (RAID1) and redundant power supplies

== Software ==
Two 64-bit operating systems run on the server nodes of the appliance: Oracle Linux version 5.5 or Solaris 11. All servers have an installed cluster configuration of Oracle WebLogic Server and distributed memory cache Oracle Coherence. To run Java applications on a machine there is a choice of HotSpot or JRockit. Management of the appliance is available in the Oracle Enterprise Manager toolset, which is also pre-installed in the appliance. A transaction monitor Tuxedo is optionally supplied.

== Customers ==
Exalogic is deployed by the University of Melbourne, Food and Drug Administration (FDA) in the United States, Amway, the Hyundai Motor Group, Bank of Chile, Haier, and Deutsche Post DHL, Public Authority of Minors Affairs (PAMA) in Kuwait .

== Criticism ==
Mark Benioff, founder of Salesforce.com, presumes that any appliance principally lacks scalability for the end-user compared with the infrastructure, supplied as service, and notes that the Exalogic approach is actually a rollback to the obsolete mainframe computer concept. Also, commentators have expressed concerns about the appropriateness of placing the word "elastic" in the name, because, despite the ability to load balance, there are obvious computing limits of the box, and those limits cannot be transcended like they should be in a true elastic environment; the same criticism applies to all solutions designed for private cloud computing, in particular, it applies to EMC Corporation and Hewlett-Packard products. However, any computing environment is a collection of servers, and since many Exalogic machines can be combined, it is not limited to the single box capacity, which may be considered as merely a building block.

== See also ==
- Oracle Corporation
- Oracle Exadata
