= The Open Group =

Global standards consortium

- Predecessor: X/Open; Open Software Foundation
- Founded: 1996; 30 years ago
- Headquarters: Offices in San Francisco; Reading, Berkshire; Brazil; Shanghai; and Mumbai
- Area served: Worldwide
- Key people: Steve Nunn (President and CEO)
- Website: www.opengroup.org

The Open Group is a global consortium that seeks to "enable the achievement of business objectives" by developing "open, vendor-neutral technology standards and certifications." It has 900+ member organizations and provides a number of services, including strategy, management, innovation and research, standards, certification, and test development. It was established in 1996 when X/Open merged with the Open Software Foundation.

The Open Group is the certifying body for the UNIX trademark, and publishes the Single UNIX Specification technical standard, which extends the POSIX standards. The Open Group also develops and manages the TOGAF standard, which is an industry standard enterprise architecture framework.

== Members ==
The 900+ members include a range of technology vendors and buyers as well as government agencies, including, for example, Capgemini, Fujitsu, Hewlett Packard Enterprise, Orbus Software, IBM, Huawei, the United States Department of Defense and NASA. There is no obligation on product developers or vendors to adopt the standards developed by the association.

Platinum members:

1. DXC Technology, United States
2. Fujitsu, Japan
3. Huawei Technologies, China
4. IBM, United States
5. Intel, United States
6. OpenText, Canada
7. Shell, Netherlands

== History ==
By the early 1990s, the major UNIX system vendors had begun to realize that the standards rivalries (often called the "Unix wars") were causing all participants more harm than good, leaving the UNIX industry open to emerging competition from Microsoft. The COSE initiative in 1993 can be considered to be the first unification step, and the merger of the Open Software Foundation (OSF) and X/Open in 1996 as the ultimate step, in the end of those skirmishes. OSF had previously merged with Unix International in 1994, meaning that the new entity effectively represented all elements of the Unix community of the time.

In January 1997, the responsibility for the X Window System was transferred to The Open Group from the defunct X Consortium. In 1999, X.Org was formed to manage the X Window System, with management services provided by The Open Group. The X.Org members made a number of releases up to and including X11R6.8 while The Open Group provided management services. In 2004, X.Org and The Open Group worked together to establish the newly formed X.Org Foundation which then took control of the x.org domain name, and the stewardship of the X Window System.

== Programs ==
=== Certification ===
Key services of The Open Group are certification programs, including certification for products and best practices: POSIX, UNIX, and O-TTPS.

The Open Group offers certifications for technology professionals. In addition to TOGAF certification which covers tools, services and people certification, The Open Group also administers the following experience-based Professional Certifications: Certified Architect (Open CA), Certification Program Accreditation, Certified Data Scientist (Open CDS), Certified Technical Specialist (Open CTS), and Certified Trusted Technology Practitioner (Open CTTP). The Open Group also offers certification for ArchiMate tools and people, as well as people certification for Open FAIR and IT4IT, standards of The Open Group.

=== Collaboration Services ===
The Open Group also provides a range of services, from initial setup and ongoing operational support to collaboration, standards and best practices development, and assistance with market impact activities. They assist organizations with setting business objectives, strategy and procurement, and also provide certification and test development. This includes services to the government agencies, suppliers, and companies or organizations set up by governments.

== Inventions and standards ==
- The ArchiMate Technical standard
- The ArchiMate Exchange File Format standard
- The Open Trusted Technology Provider Standard (O-TTPS)
- The Call Level Interface (the basis for ODBC)
- The Common Desktop Environment (CDE)
- The Distributed Computing Environment (the basis for DCOM)
- The Distributed Relational Database Architecture (DRDA)
- The Future Airborne Capability Environment (FACE) Technical standard
- The Motif GUI widget toolkit (used in CDE)
- The Open Process Automation Standard (O-PAS Standard)
- The Open Group Service Integration Maturity Model (OSIMM)
- The Open Information Security Maturity Model (O-ISM3)
- The Single UNIX Specification (SUS)
- The Service-Oriented Architecture (SOA) Source Book
- TOGAF (Enterprise Architecture Framework)
- The Application Response Measurement (ARM) standard
- The Common Manageability Programming Interface (CMPI) standard
- The Universal Data Element Framework (UDEF) standard
- The XA Specification

== See also ==
- Joint Inter-Domain Management
