= Long-running transaction =

Computer database transaction pattern

Long-running transactions (also known as the saga interaction pattern) are computer database transactions that avoid locks on non-local resources, use compensation to handle failures, potentially aggregate smaller ACID transactions (also referred to as atomic transactions), and typically use a coordinator to complete or abort the transaction. In contrast to rollback in ACID transactions, compensation restores the original state, or an equivalent, and is business-specific. For example, the compensating action for making a hotel reservation is canceling that reservation.

A number of protocols have been specified for long-running transactions using Web services within business processes. OASIS Business Transaction Processing and WS-CAF are examples. These protocols use a coordinator to mediate the successful completion or use of compensation in a long-running transaction.

== See also ==
- Compensating transaction
- Long-lived transaction
- Optimistic concurrency control
