= Unit of work =

Concept in software engineering

A unit of work is a behavioral pattern in software development. Martin Fowler has defined it as everything one does during a business transaction which can affect the database. When the unit of work is finished, it will provide everything that needs to be done to change the database as a result of the work.

A unit of work encapsulates one or more code repositories^{[de]} and a list of actions to be performed which are necessary for the successful implementation of self-contained and consistent data change. A unit of work is also responsible for handling concurrency issues, and can be used for transactions and stability patterns.^{[de]}

== See also ==
- ACID (atomicity, consistency, isolation, durability), a set of properties of database transactions
- Database transaction, a unit of work within a database management system
- Equi-join, a type of join where only equal signs are used in the join predicate
- Lossless join decomposition, decomposition of a relation such that a natural join of the resulting relations yields back the original relation
