= No-force =

A no-force policy is used in transaction control in database theory. The term no-force refers to the disk pages related to the actual database object being modified.

With a no-force policy, when a transaction commits, the changes made to the actual objects are not "forced", that is, required to be written to disk in-place.

A record of the changes must still be preserved at commit time to ensure that the transaction is durable. This record is typically written to a sequential transaction log, so that the actual changes to the database objects as recorded on disk can be written at a later time.

For frequently changed objects, a no-force policy allows updates to be merged and so reduces the number of write operations to the on-disk database object. A no-force policy also reduces the seek time required for a commit by having mostly sequential write operations to the transaction log, rather than requiring the disk to seek to many distinct database objects during a commit.
