= Post void =

Concept in accounting

In the context of point-of-sale and accounting systems, the term post void is a transaction which cancels, or deletes entirely, a previously completed transaction.

The distinction is that the transaction being voided is one that has already been completed, versus one that is still in the process of being made.

The ability to post-void a transaction is normally restricted to supervisory personnel. Although the capacity to perform such a transaction is not necessarily fraudulent, there are many scenarios of employee theft, embezzlement, and so-on which could be enabled in part by the intentional misuse of this capability. Auditors and loss prevention departments routinely scrutinize these transactions very closely for this reason.

== See also ==
- Compensating transaction
- Long-running transaction
