= Algorithms for Recovery and Isolation Exploiting Semantics =

Recovery algorithm

In computer science, Algorithms for Recovery and Isolation Exploiting Semantics, or ARIES, is a recovery algorithm designed to work with a no-force, steal database approach; it is used by IBM Db2, Microsoft SQL Server and many other database systems. IBM Fellow Chandrasekaran Mohan is the primary inventor of the ARIES family of algorithms.

Three main principles lie behind ARIES:

- Write-ahead logging: Any change to an object is first recorded in the log, and the log must be written to stable storage before changes to the object are written to disk.
- Repeating history during Redo: On restart after a crash, ARIES retraces the actions of a database before the crash and brings the system back to the exact state that it was in before the crash. Then it undoes the transactions still active at crash time.
- Logging changes during Undo: Changes made to the database while undoing transactions are logged to ensure such an action isn't repeated in the event of repeated restarts.

== Logging ==
The ARIES algorithm relies on logging of all database operations with ascending Sequence Numbers. Usually the resulting logfile is stored on so-called "stable storage", that is a storage medium that is assumed to survive crashes and hardware failures.

To gather the necessary information for the logs, two data structures have to be maintained: the dirty page table (DPT) and the transaction table (TT).

The dirty page table keeps record of all the pages that have been modified, and not yet written to disk, and the first Sequence Number that caused that page to become dirty. The transaction table contains all currently running transactions and the Sequence Number of the last log entry they created.

We create log records of the form (Sequence Number, Transaction ID, Page ID, Redo, Undo, Previous Sequence Number). The Redo and Undo fields keep information about the changes this log record saves and how to undo them. The Previous Sequence Number is a reference to the previous log record that was created for this transaction. In the case of an aborted transaction, it's possible to traverse the log file in reverse order using the Previous Sequence Numbers, undoing all actions taken within the specific transaction.

Every transaction implicitly begins with the first "Update" type of entry for the given Transaction ID, and is committed with "End Of Log" (EOL) entry for the transaction.

During a recovery, or while undoing the actions of an aborted transaction, a special kind of log record is written, the Compensation Log Record (CLR), to record that the action has already been undone. CLRs are of the form (Sequence Number, Transaction ID, Page ID, Redo, Previous Sequence Number, Next Undo Sequence Number). The Redo field contains application of Undo field of reverted action, and the Undo field is omitted because CLR is never reverted.

== Recovery ==
The recovery works in three phases. The first phase, Analysis, computes all the necessary information from the logfile. The Redo phase restores the database to the exact state at the crash, including all the changes of uncommitted transactions that were running at that point in time. The Undo phase then undoes all uncommitted changes, leaving the database in a consistent state.

=== Analysis ===
During the Analysis phase we restore the DPT and the TT as they were at the time of the crash.

We run through the logfile (from the beginning or the last checkpoint) and add all transactions for which we encounter Begin Transaction entries to the TT. Whenever an End Log entry is found, the corresponding transaction is removed. The last Sequence Number for each transaction is also maintained.

During the same run we also fill the dirty page table by adding a new entry whenever we encounter a page that is modified and not yet in the DPT. This however only computes a superset of all dirty pages at the time of the crash, since we don't check the actual database file whether the page was written back to the storage.

=== Redo ===
From the DPT, we can compute the minimal Sequence Number of a dirty page. From there, we have to start redoing the actions until the crash, in case they weren't persisted already.

Running through the log file, we check for each entry, whether the modified page P on the entry exists in the DPT. If it doesn't, then we do not have to worry about redoing this entry since the data persists on the disk. If page P exists in the DPT table, then we see whether the Sequence Number in the DPT is smaller than the Sequence Number of the log record (i.e. whether the change in the log is newer than the last version that was persisted). If it isn't, then we don't redo the entry since the change is already there. If it is, we fetch the page from the database storage and check the Sequence Number stored on the page to the Sequence Number on the log record. If the former is smaller than the latter, the page needs to be written to the disk. That check is necessary because the recovered DPT is only a conservative superset of the pages that really need changes to be reapplied. Lastly, when all the above checks are finished and failed, we reapply the redo action and store the new Sequence Number on the page. It is also important for recovery from a crash during the Redo phase, as the redo isn't applied twice to the same page.

=== Undo ===
After the Redo phase, the database reflects the exact state at the crash. However the changes of uncommitted transactions have to be undone to restore the database to a consistent state.

For that we run backwards through the log for each transaction in the TT (those runs can of course be combined into one) using the Previous Sequence Number fields in the records. For each record we undo the changes (using the information in the Undo field) and write a compensation log record to the log file. If we encounter a Begin Transaction record we write an End Log record for that transaction.

The compensation log records make it possible to recover during a crash that occurs during the recovery phase. That isn't as uncommon as one might think, as it is possible for the recovery phase to take quite long. CLRs are read during the Analysis phase and redone during the Redo phase.

== Checkpoints ==
To avoid re-scanning the whole logfile during the analysis phase it is advisable to save the DPT and the TT regularly to the logfile, forming a checkpoint. Instead of having to run through the whole file it is just necessary to run backwards until a checkpoint is found. From that point it is possible to restore the DPT and the TT as they were at the time of the crash by reading the logfile forward again. Then it is possible to proceed as usual with Redo and Undo.

The naive way for checkpointing involves locking the whole database to avoid changes to the DPT and the TT during the creation of the checkpoint. Fuzzy logging circumvents that by writing two log records. One Fuzzy Log Starts Here record and, after preparing the checkpoint data, the actual checkpoint. Between the two records other log records can be created. During recovery it is necessary to find both records to obtain a valid checkpoint.
