= 2PL =

2PL may refer to:

- Two-phase locking, a concurrency control locking protocol in databases and transaction processing
- the glossing abbreviation for second person, plural
