= Re:Zero season 1 =

First season of anime television series

Re:Zero − Starting Life in Another World
- Season 1
- Cover art for the first home media volume of the first season, featuring Emilia (center) and Puck (far left)
- No. of episodes: 25 (2016 TV broadcast); 13 (2020 director's cut)

Release
- Original network: TV Tokyo
- Original release: April 4 – September 19, 2016

Season chronology
- Next → Season 2

Re:Zero − Starting Life in Another World is an anime television series based on the light novel series of the same name written by Tappei Nagatsuki and illustrated by Shinichirou Otsuka. The 25-episode first season aired from April 4 (Note: TV Tokyo listed the series premiere as airing on April 3 at 25:35, which is effectively April 4 at 1:35 a.m. JST.) to September 19, 2016, with an extended 52-minute first episode. It was broadcast on TV Tokyo and its affiliates. The series was streamed by Crunchyroll. The season adapts the first three arcs of the series (volumes 1–9 of the light novel).

The first opening theme song is "Redo", performed by Konomi Suzuki, and the first ending theme song is "Styx Helix", while for episode 7 it was "Straight Bet", both performed by Myth & Roid. The second opening theme song is "Paradisus-Paradoxum", performed by Myth & Roid, while the second ending theme song is "Stay Alive", performed by Rie Takahashi; for episode 14 it was "Theater D", performed by Myth & Roid.

From January to April 2020 a "Director's Cut" of the first season was released. The original 25-episode season was re-edited into thirteen extended 50-minute episodes, which included several altered scenes and some additional footage.

== Episodes ==
No. overall	No. in season	Title	Directed by	Written by	Storyboarded by	Original release date
1	1	"The End of the Beginning and the Beginning of the End"; Transliteration: "Hajimari no Owari to Owari no Hajimari" (Japanese: 始まりの終わりと終わりの始まり)	Masaharu Watanabe	Masahiro Yokotani	Masaharu Watanabe	April 4, 2016 (Note: Episode 1 is a 52-minute special.)
On the way home from a convenience store, Subaru Natsuki finds himself in another world at a marketplace. He converses with a fruit vendor, and is then attacked by three hoodlums in an alley. Subaru is saved by a silver-haired half-elf girl, who after learning that Subaru is unfamiliar with the local history, geography, and language, introduces herself as Satella, and her companion, a floating cat spirit named Puck; he decides to return the favor by retrieving her insignia that was stolen by a thief named Felt. Subaru and Satella travel to the loot house where Felt was going to sell the insignia only to find her dead, and shortly after entering they are also killed. Subaru's special ability "Return by Death" activates and he finds himself reset back at the moment he was speaking with the vendor. Unaware of his power and resurrection, Subaru decides to head out again to the loot house. This time he meets Felt and Rom, and negotiates with them for the insignia. Elsa Granhiert, the person who killed Subaru in the first timeline, arrives and Subaru offers his cell phone whose camera feature is perceived to be more valuable than the money Elsa has, so Felt and Rom accept his offer. However, Elsa kills everybody again after Subaru states his intention to return the insignia to its original owner. Subaru respawns once again, this time greeting Satella in the street, but she becomes immediately offended because "Satella" is the name of the "Witch of Envy", which is taboo in this realm.
2	2	"Reunion with the Witch"; Transliteration: "Saikai no Majo" (Japanese: 再会の魔女)	Masahiro Shinohara	Masahiro Yokotani	Kenichi Kawamura	April 11, 2016
Seemingly irritated by being called the name of the "Witch of Envy", "Satella" leaves. Subaru attempts to prevent the insignia from being stolen, but fails and is killed again, this time by the hoodlums in the alley while chasing Felt. After respawning, Subaru finally realizes his "Return by Death" ability, and changes his approach by not meeting "Satella" and instead trying to buy the insignia from Felt before Elsa could negotiate. In the alley, he is saved from the hoodlums by Reinhard van Astrea, and Subaru asks him to tell "Satella" not to come to the loot house. As Subaru heads over to the loot house, he runs into Elsa, who notes his unusual behavior. Later, Subaru sees Felt and tells her what Rom said about the phone's worth in the previous timeline. Rom appraises the phone and confirms its value, but Felt refuses to sell him the insignia without first hearing Elsa's offer due to Subaru's suspicious behavior. Someone knocks at the door and Subaru is worried that it is Elsa, but he is surprised to see "Satella", whom he thought was told not to come to the house.
3	3	"Starting Life from Zero in Another World"; Transliteration: "Zero kara Hajimaru Isekai Seikatsu" (Japanese: ゼロから始まる異世界生活)	Kazuomi Koga	Masahiro Yokotani	Masaharu Watanabe	April 18, 2016
Shortly after "Satella" arrives, Elsa appears and begins attacking everyone. "Satella" and Puck gain the upper hand with their ice-magic combination teamwork, but Puck is forced to return into his mana crystal vessel, as he loses his ability to manifest in the physical world at night. Felt is ordered to flee the house, Rom is severely wounded, and "Satella" is getting exhausted while fighting Elsa. Reinhard then arrives and announces himself as a "Sword Saint" while Elsa introduces herself as the "bowel hunter". "Satella" heals Rom's wounds while Reinhard keeps Elsa distracted, using a van Astrea sword technique to defeat Elsa. However, Elsa survives and attacks "Satella", but Subaru intercepts her with Rom's club, thus taking the hit intended for "Satella". At Subaru's request as thanks for saving her, she reveals her real name is Emilia, just as he collapses, realizing that he had been slashed by Elsa, who escapes. Felt returns the insignia to Emilia in gratitude. Reinhard initially intends to let Felt go, but after seeing the insignia glittering in her hand, he changes his mind and takes Felt with him, claiming that he can't overlook her crime of stealing the insignia despite being off-duty. He also warns Emilia that the quiet life will soon come to an end, and that she might be summoned soon.
4	4	"The Happy Roswaal Mansion Family"; Transliteration: "Rozuwāru-tei no Danran" (Japanese: ロズワール邸の団欒)	Yoshinobu Tokumoto	Masahiro Yokotani	Masayuki Sakoi	April 25, 2016
Subaru wakes up at a mansion fully healed in the middle of the night, realizing that Emilia saved his life. He meets Beatrice in the library after wandering through the hallways, but she drains his mana causing him to fall unconscious. He then wakes up in his room again in the morning with the maid twins Ram and Rem in the bedroom. He reunites with Emilia and Puck, and then meets the owner of the mansion Roswaal L. Mathers, who tells him that Emilia needs the insignia to be qualified as a candidate of the next monarch in the upcoming royal election. As a reward, Subaru asks to work at the mansion as a butler. Working alongside Ram and Rem, Subaru struggles with all of his duties during his first days on the job. He visits the local village with them to buy supplies where he plays with some children and a puppy which bites him on the hand. That night, Subaru asks Emilia to go on a date with him to the village and she agrees. However, when Subaru wakes up the next morning, he finds himself back at the first day of the mansion, waking up to see Ram and Rem greeting him with his hand healed, realizing that he must have died during that night.
5	5	"The Morning of Our Promise Is Still Distant"; Transliteration: "Yakusoku Shita Asa wa Tōku" (Japanese: 約束した朝は遠く)	Daisuke Takashima	Masahiro Yokotani	Manabu Okamoto	May 2, 2016
Subaru is reintroduced to Rem and Ram. To figure out how he died, Subaru attempts to recreate the timeline by trying to trigger events that had happened in the previous timeline, which works only partially because of events that he did not experience in the previous timeline, such as being taught to read and write by Ram. During chores, Subaru and Ram's relationship deepens which seems to bother Rem. While out shopping, Rem tells Subaru that her dedication to her sister Ram is like a "fanatical demon" and then proceeds to ask Subaru what he thinks about demons. Since Rem and Ram are busy, Emilia teaches Subaru to read/write, and he again successfully asks her on a date to the village to see the children, puppy, and flower fields. That night, Subaru attempts to stay up, thinking about his actions in the new timeline, realizing he had fixed and missed certain events from the previous one. However, he dozes off and abruptly wakes up in the middle of the night feeling violently ill. He staggers through the mansion and as he struggles to walk down a hallway, he is attacked by an unseen assailant and viciously killed.
6	6	"The Sound of Chains"; Transliteration: "Kusari no Oto" (Japanese: 鎖の音)	Hideyo Yamamoto	Yoshiko Nakamura	Shunsuke Nakashige	May 9, 2016
Subaru abruptly wakes in his room for the third time, with his injuries healed again. Realizing he has four days before the attacker strikes again, he chooses the role of a guest in Roswaal's mansion. He asks Beatrice about magic that can weaken and kill, and she proposes two possible causes: a curse, which she considers unlikely, or draining of mana, which she thinks only she and Puck within the mansion can do. She also reveals that she healed him when he first arrived at the mansion. During a talk with Ram, Subaru tells her a folktale in which a blue demon sacrificed his own reputation to help his friend, a red demon. Ram comments that both demons were fools and Subaru and Ram disagree about the messages within the story. Subaru says that from their folktale books, he learned about the legends of the dragon and kingdom, and the story of the Witch of Envy, which Ram refuses to discuss. She also advises Subaru not to tell his demon story to Rem. On the fourth day, Subaru decides to leave and observe the mansion from a nearby cliff. At sunset, he is suddenly attacked by a heavy spiked ball and chain. He evades the first two impacts and grabs the chain of the assailant, who, to his shock, turns out to be Rem.
7	7	"Natsuki Subaru's Restart"; Transliteration: "Natsuki Subaru no Risutāto" (Japanese: ナツキ・スバルのリスタート)	Yoshito Mikamo	Yoshiko Nakamura	Masaharu Watanabe & Pyeon-Gang Ho	May 16, 2016
Rem tortures Subaru, suspecting that he belongs to a faction against Emilia and states that he has the smell of a witch, before being mercifully killed by Ram in the middle of the interrogation. Subaru resets once again in the mansion, and fearfully meets Ram and Rem again. Subaru tries to tell Emilia about his "Return by Death", but just as he speaks, a black shadow with hands overwhelms him. Two days later, Beatrice also states that he has a strong smell of the witch about him, but Subaru asks her to guarantee his safety on the fourth night, to which she agrees. He gets through the night safely, but the next morning he finds that Rem is dead, leaving Ram grief-stricken. Ram suspects Subaru and tries to attack him, but Beatrice protects him because of their contract. Subaru runs away to a cliff where Beatrice approaches him and informs him that the maids are incomplete with one missing, and offers to help him to escape the territory. Ram also arrives at the cliff, swearing to kill Subaru. Believing that his own cowardice has led to Rem's tragedy, and that he cares for the mansion's inhabitants, Subaru jumps off the cliff to his death announcing that he will save them all.
8	8	"I Cried, Cried My Lungs Out, and Stopped Crying"; Transliteration: "Naite Naki Wameite Naki Yandakara" (Japanese: 泣いて泣き喚いて泣き止んだから)	Manabu Okamoto	Masahiro Yokotani	Manabu Okamoto	May 23, 2016
Subaru resets again back to the first day at the mansion. Realizing that his trust level with the maid twins is important, he asks to work at the mansion as a butler again. While taking a break from work, Subaru asks Puck to teach him how to use magic to defeat the mysterious entity working behind the scenes, which he believes to be a shaman. Puck analyzes Subaru's mana to determine his attribute and finds out that his is "shadow". Subaru learns from Beatrice the dreadful legend of the Witch of Envy, Satella, and deduces that Emilia's intentions in the first timeline were to be excluded from the royal election. During his training, Subaru struggles to utilize magic. Continuing with his work as a butler, he mentally and physically overexerts himself in his effort to gain the trust of the twin maids and falls asleep crying in Emilia's lap as she helps him let his emotions out. That night, Subaru wakes up and asks Beatrice about detecting curses, learning that curses must be activated through physical contact, and through that piece of information he joyfully deduces that the curse came from the village. The next day, Subaru returns to work and gets the twins to agree to go with him to the village.
9	9	"The Meaning of Courage"; Transliteration: "Yūki no Imi" (Japanese: 勇気の意味)	Hiroyuki Tsuchiya	Yoshiko Nakamura	Ryouki Kamitsubo	May 30, 2016
Subaru visits the village with Ram and Rem with the purpose of finding the culprit when the puppy bites him again. When the three return from the village, Roswaal leaves for the night, which did not happen in the previous timelines. Subaru sees Beatrice who confirms that he is cursed and traces it to the dog that bit him. Subaru realizes that the children are in danger and that night, he returns to the village with Rem and finds that the children have gone missing. They venture into the forest and find all but one of the missing children, who have all been bitten by the puppy. While Rem heals the children, Subaru surprises her with his awareness of his witch stench, and goes searching for the last child and gets attacked by a Mabeast. Subaru defeats the Mabeast, but a pack of them surround him, controlled by the demon puppy. Rem arrives and clears a path back towards the village, but the Mabeasts overwhelm Rem who unleashes the demon within her and goes berserk. With Rem about to be killed, Subaru stands in to take the attack.
10	10	"Fanatical Methods Like a Demon"; Transliteration: "Oni Gakatta Yarikata" (Japanese: 鬼がかったやり方)	Yoshinobu Tokumoto	Masahiro Yokotani	Naoto Hosoda	June 6, 2016
Subaru wakes up the next day having survived the attack with the timely arrival of Emilia and Ram. The barrier surrounding the village is restored to keep it safe from Mabeasts. However, Subaru is afflicted by a large number of interwoven curses from the bites he received and Beatrice is unable to lift them all before they take effect. Subaru is given a sword by the villagers and heads into the forest with Ram to kill the puppy controlling the Mabeasts, lift the curses on him, and find Rem, who had gone mad in her attempt to fight all the beasts. To his disappointment, Ram reveals to Subaru that she does not have a demon horn like Rem and is less powerful. Subaru draws the Mabeasts toward him by attempting to reveal the truth about his Return by Death. Subaru and Ram are chased and fall down a cliff where they are met by a pack of Mabeasts and a berserk Rem. Using information provided by Ram, Subaru puts a plan into motion to hit Rem's horn so that she will regain her senses.
11	11	"Rem"; Transliteration: "Remu" (Japanese: レム)	Daigo Yamagishi	Masahiro Yokotani	Daigo Yamagishi	June 13, 2016
In the past, Ram and Rem lived in a demon village where the birth of twins is considered taboo. Ram was a prodigy, while Rem struggled with life. One day, Ram's horn was cut off by the Witch Cult and Rem has been blaming herself since. Back in the present, Rem regains her senses after Subaru knocks her unconscious. Subaru, Ram, and Rem run away from the Mabeasts, but they encounter the puppy shaman behind the attack. So the twins can escape, Subaru stays put to fight the shaman, who has transformed into a fearsome beast. Subaru stabs the shaman with his broken sword, but the attack is not effective. Just as Subaru is about to be killed, Roswaal arrives to defeat the shaman and the remaining Mabeasts, which also removes the curses on Subaru. Back at the mansion, Subaru wakes up with Rem in the room, and Subaru tells Rem to keep on living for the future rather than to feel sorry for herself, causing her to fall in love with him. That night, Subaru again asks Emilia to go on a date with him to the village the next day, and she agrees.
12	12	"Return to the Capital"; Transliteration: "Sairai no Ōto" (Japanese: 再来の王都)	Daisuke Takashima	Masahiro Yokotani	Kazuhiro Ozawa	June 20, 2016
One month after the Mabeast incident, Subaru and Emilia return from a morning outing with the Arlam village kids. At the mansion, Emilia is summoned to the capital as part of the royal election, and the two are escorted by Wilhelm van Astrea and Felix Argyle. At the capital, Subaru reunites with the fruit merchant and buys a bag of apples as thanks. They then meet Julius Juukulius and the sight of him chivalrously kissing Emilia's hand causes a jealous reaction by Subaru. He then witnesses a redheaded young woman, Priscilla Barielle, being chased by the same three hoodlums who confronted him in previous timelines. He goes into the alley to save her but the hoodlums run away when Rom appears looking for Felt, whom Subaru says was taken away by Reinhard. Later, Emilia insists that Subaru does not accompany her to the castle where the candidates for the upcoming royal election will gather. However, the next day Subaru breaks his promise and accepts a ride to the castle with Priscilla and her companion Al in their carriage. At the castle, Emilia is shocked to see Subaru with Priscilla who calls Subaru her manservant. As Emilia, and the other royal candidates, Priscilla, Anastasia Hoshin, and Crusch Karsten wait, to everybody's surprise, Reinhard introduces Felt as the fifth and final candidate.
13	13	"Self-Proclaimed Knight Natsuki Subaru"; Transliteration: "Jishō Kishi Natsuki Subaru" (Japanese: 自称騎士ナツキ・スバル)	Kazuomi Koga	Masahiro Yokotani	Nobuyoshi Nagayama	June 27, 2016
The nobles are surprised to hear that Felt is from the slums which causes tension between them and the Imperial Knights. Felt declares that she won't enter the royal election, and picks a fight with the other candidates. When Emilia is criticized for being a half-elf, Subaru declares that he is Emilia's knight, accidentally insulting the Knights of Lugunica and offending Julius. Rom breaks into the throne room to take Felt away, though he is easily caught. In a desperate attempt to save him, Felt agrees to enter the royal election, and declares that she will destroy the current nation when she wins. Afterwards, Julius challenges Subaru to a duel with wooden swords because of his insult of the Imperial Knights and viciously beats Subaru in a one-sided battle. When Subaru wakes up, Emilia tells him to stay in the capital to recover, as she and Roswaal return to the mansion. When Subaru refuses, Emilia asks about his reasons on going so far to help her, but Subaru is unable to tell her about his ability nor what happened in the first timeline. Emilia then accuses Subaru of trying to help himself under the guise of helping her, believing herself to be unworthy of happiness because she is a half-elf. This results in Subaru losing his sanity, verbally attacking Emilia with his experiences in the other timelines and claiming that Emilia owes him far more than he ever owed her. Unable to understand each other, nor able to trust Subaru anymore, Emilia decides to end their friendship.
14	14	"The Sickness Called Despair"; Transliteration: "Zetsubō to iu Yamai" (Japanese: 絶望という病)	Mamoru Taisuke	Eiji Umehara	Taisuke Mori	July 4, 2016
Three days after the Royal Candidate Selection, Subaru and Rem stay at Karsten mansion to recuperate and for the former's treatment. Frustrated at his weakness, Subaru trains obsessively with Wilhelm, but shows little improvement. Reinhard comes to apologize to Subaru for Julius's actions and Julius now have tarnished his own reputation, and asks him to reconcile with Julius, but Subaru refuses. Subaru and Rem go to town and see the apple vendor again who says that people will not support Emilia for the royal election because of her link to the Witch of Envy. At night, over drinks, Crusch tells Subaru to be more positive, and Felix says that he should find a way to make up with Emilia. Rem tells them that through her connection with Ram, something is occurring back at Mathers' domain. Subaru and Rem decide to return to Roswaal's mansion, but while staying at a hotel, Rem leaves during the night to help on her own in the hopes of protecting Subaru. Upon learning this, Subaru hires a cart driver named Otto Suwen to take him to the mansion, but at nightfall, Otto's ground dragon refuses to continue. Subaru walks on alone and meets a group of dark robed and hooded humans who encircle Subaru before disappearing. At dawn, he reaches the Arlam village, and finds dead bodies everywhere, and when he reaches the mansion, he is distraught to see Rem's body.
15	15	"The Outside of Madness"; Transliteration: "Kyōki no Sotogawa" (Japanese: 狂気の外側)	Hiroyuki Tsuchiya	Eiji Umehara	Naoto Hosoda	July 11, 2016
Subaru enters the mansion to find it littered with bodies, including Ram and the children he once saved, and eventually discovers an icy room where he freezes to death. He resets with a new timeline back at the vendor's stall again, where he hugs Rem and goes catatonic. Crusch and Felix can heal him physically but unfortunately cannot help with his mental state. Rem and Subaru head home, but their cart is ambushed by the Witch Cult and while Rem fights them, one escapes with the broken Subaru. Subaru finds himself chained up and meets their leader, the maniacal Sin Archbishop of Sloth, Petelgeuse Romanée-Conti, who criticizes him for "faking his insanity". Rem finds the meeting place and attempts to destroy Petelgeuse and his men, but to no avail. Rem is then tortured by Petelgeuse and left in a mess, with both arms and legs mangled and broken. Petelgeuse leaves Subaru to die, however Rem, with what little life she has, uses magic to cut the chains and then tells Subaru "to live" and that she loves him, before passing away. Subaru carries Rem's body to the mansion, seeing piles of bodies along the way. He finally arrives at the mansion, only to find a dead Ram before a monstrous Puck who appears outside the mansion and tells Subaru to "sleep along with my daughter" and decapitates him. Subaru then respawns by the vendor's stall again and curses Petelgeuse.
16	16	"The Greed of a Pig"; Transliteration: "Buta no Yokubō" (Japanese: 豚の欲望)	Yoshinobu Tokumoto	Yoshiko Nakamura	Shunsuke Nakashige	July 18, 2016
Knowing that Petelgeuse's cult is going to attack the mansion and village in three days, Subaru seeks help from the other royal candidates. He first asks for Crusch's aid, but she has nothing to gain from saving her rival and has no intention of helping Subaru whom she feels is driven by hatred and madness. Next, he asks Priscilla and is prompted to lick her foot, unaware that it is a joke. Subaru complies and Priscilla viciously kicks him, scolding him for lacking loyalty and devotion to Emilia. He then passes Anastasia on the streets and engages in negotiation with her, but he ends up being tricked into giving her information about Crusch. Anastasia walks away letting Subaru know that understanding what the other party wants is the key to negotiation. Concluding that none of the other candidates are going to help, Subaru decides to head back to the mansion and village with Rem to evacuate everybody. Keeping Anastasia's advice in mind, Subaru manages to negotiate with Otto and his band of merchants to provide transport for the villagers in exchange for buying Otto's excess oil supply. On the trip back, Otto's wagon becomes shrouded in fog and they encounter the White Whale that forced him to take a detour during the previous timeline. Subaru notices that one of the accompanying merchants has disappeared but Otto has no memory of him.
17	17	"Disgrace in the Extreme"; Transliteration: "Shūtai no Hate ni" (Japanese: 醜態の果てに)	Yoshito Mikamo	Yoshiko Nakamura	Takaharu Ozaki	July 25, 2016
With the White Whale closing in, Rem decides to sacrifice herself to intercept it so that Subaru and Otto can get away, so she knocks out Subaru. When he wakes up, Otto says he has no memory of Rem. With the White Whale still in pursuit, Subaru realizes that it is a Mabeast and is therefore attracted to him. Otto pushes Subaru off the wagon in an attempt to save himself and Subaru almost dies. Later, Subaru encounters Otto's wagon and is taken the rest of the way alone by the ground dragon. The next morning, the villagers find Subaru and he collapses. He wakes up in the mansion alongside Ram having been healed by Emilia. When Subaru tells Ram about Rem, she has no memory of her sister and when he tells Emilia, she likewise has no memory of her. Furious, Subaru decides to tell Emilia about his "Return by Death", but as he does so, everything goes dark and hands reach out from him, causing Emilia to die in his arms. Beatrice enters and instead of killing Subaru as he expected, she teleports him and Emilia out of the mansion. Petelgeuse and his cult appear and prepare to tear Emilia apart, but the monstrous Puck arrives asking what they plan to do to his daughter.
18	18	"From Zero"; Transliteration: "Zero kara" (Japanese: ゼロから)	Kazuomi Koga	Yoshiko Nakamura	Nobuyoshi Nagayama	August 1, 2016
The monstrous Puck kills Petelgeuse and his cult, then freezes Subaru to death as punishment for letting Emilia die, depriving Puck's reason for living. A despair-ridden Subaru resets again at the vendor's stall. Rem notices a sudden change in his behavior and Subaru drags her aside. He asks her to run away with him, but she refuses as she would only do that with the Subaru she knows, and not his current self. He berates himself for the life he has wasted and his ineffectiveness in helping those he cares about, but Rem professes her love for him even though she understands that Subaru's heart belongs to Emilia. Through Rem's belief in him, Subaru overcomes his sorrow and despair. With his resolve renewed, he sets out to become a hero, wanting to start again from zero.
19	19	"Battle Against the White Whale"; Transliteration: "Hakugei Kōryaku Sen" (Japanese: 白鯨攻略戦)	Daisuke Takashima	Eiji Umehara	Shunsuke Nakashige	August 8, 2016
In this new timeline, Subaru changes his approach, deciding to defeat the White Whale before going after the Witch's Cult. Knowing when the White Whale will strike from the previous timeline, Subaru offers Crusch's camp an alliance to battle the White Whale in exchange for shared mining rights of magic stones in Roswaal's domain. She agrees when Subaru uses his cell phone to show the time and location of the attack and offers to draw the whale towards himself. Anastasia's camp also agrees to join the campaign, viewing the whale's presence as detrimental to her interests as well. Crusch is impressed by his skill in gathering support, and Wilhelm lets Subaru know that his wife Theresia, the Sword Saint, was killed by the White Whale and has devoted his life to defeating it. The next day, Subaru and Rem, riding a ground dragon called Patrasche, with the armies of the Crusch and Anastasia camps, head out to the Flugel tree to wait for the whale to appear. Subaru takes the time to get acquainted with Anastasia's private army the Iron Fang including their captain Ricardo and siblings Mimi and Hetaro. That night, the whale appears at the moment Subaru said it would and the battle begins.
20	20	"Wilhelm van Astrea"; Transliteration: "Viruherumu van Asutorea" (Japanese: ヴィルヘルム・ヴァン・アストレア)	Hiroyuki Tsuchiya	Eiji Umehara	Masaharu Watanabe	August 15, 2016
The battle with the White Whale begins with the night banisher fired to temporarily change the appearance of the nighttime sky to daytime. Subaru and Rem draw the whale towards them with the Crusch and Anastasia armies attacking the whale, and Wilhelm slashing the whale at close range hoping to ground it. However, the whale is still floating in the sky after those attacks and it unleashes a fog from glands on its skin. Subaru and Rem evade a fog blast, which Subaru realizes erases a person's existence, calling it a "Fog of Elimination". The armies begin to lose soldiers and Subaru yells out his "Return by Death" to draw the whale towards him and away from the injured soldiers. Wilhelm and Ricardo's unit follow Subaru and relentlessly attack the whale, but they suffer setbacks as Wilhelm gets swallowed by it and Ricardo is badly injured. As the fog clears, three whales are seen floating in the sky.
21	21	"A Wager That Defies Despair"; Transliteration: "Zetsubō ni Aragau Kake" (Japanese: 絶望に抗う賭け)	Yoshinobu Tokumoto	Eiji Umehara	Masaharu Watanabe, Kenji Takahashi & Cagetzu Aizawa	August 22, 2016
The armies become demoralized with the appearance of three whales. While running with Crusch and watching the armies battle two whales who attack them, Subaru notices the difference in fighting strength and the gouged left eye in all three whales. This leads him to conclude that two whales are doppelgangers of the third that is keeping its distance from the armies and that they need to defeat that one. To draw the whale to the ground, Rem launches Subaru on an ice shard towards the whale. Subaru taunts it, and then falls towards the ground, using his smell of the Witch to draw it towards him and the Flugel tree. Rem catches Subaru, and the armies use magic and explosives to cut through the base of the tree, falling it onto the passing whale. Immobilized by the tree, Wilhelm slashes away wildly at the whale, killing it and avenging Theresia's death, and causing the other two to vanish. With the whale defeated, Subaru turns his attention to his original objective of saving Emilia and the villagers from the Witch's Cult. In recognition of his courage, the Crusch and Anastasia camps provide some soldiers and knights for Subaru to destroy the cult that includes Wilhelm, Felix, Richardo, Mimi, and her other brother Tivey, while Crusch along with the injured and weak (including Rem and Hetaro) travel back. A group of Anastasia's mercenaries provide further reinforcements, only for Subaru to learn that Julius is among them.
22	22	"A Flash of Sloth"; Transliteration: "Taida Issen" (Japanese: 怠惰一閃)	Kenji Takahashi & Mamoru Taisuke	Masahiro Yokotani	Nobuyoshi Nagayama	August 29, 2016
After trading insults with Julius, Subaru reconciles with him somewhat. Subaru's attack on the Witch's Cult begins by approaching Petelgeuse using his smell of the Witch which makes Petelgeuse believe that Subaru is the Archbishop of Pride. When Petelgeuse realizes that Subaru doesn't have the Gospel he should have received as an Archbishop, which he claims he defiled, Petelgeuse completely loses his composure. With his guard down, Mimi and Tivey launch a surprise attack to destroy the hideout and Wilhelm kills Petelgeuse while the rest of his band go after Petelgeuse's ten disciples, also known as the Fingers. However, Petelgeuse's soul is still present in one of the Fingers who attacks, using Unseen Hands to kill some of the group and capture Subaru. Fortunately, the Finger is distracted by a tiny spirit and Wilhelm kills her and rescues Subaru. Subaru is upset at his critical mistake which allowed soldiers to die, but Wilhelm tells him to keep fighting. As the merchants ride to evacuate people from the mansion and the village, Felix tells Subaru to make up with Julius. As Subaru approaches Julius, he finds himself suddenly alone on the road enveloped in a blue mist and Ram mysteriously appears on a cliff above holding a bright blue flower.
23	23	"Nefarious Sloth"; Transliteration: "Akuratsu Naru Taida" (Japanese: 悪辣なる怠惰)	Yoshinobu Tokumoto	Masahiro Yokotani	Kazuhiro Ozawa	September 5, 2016
Subaru is enveloped in a blue mist and attacked by plants, but is saved from the illusion by the same tiny spirit called Ia that Julius had set onto Subaru to protect him. After Julius frees the rest of the soldiers and merchants from the enchantment, Subaru is attacked by Ram who thinks that he abandoned Emilia. When the misunderstanding is cleared up, Subaru tries to begin the evacuation of the villagers. They mistrust him and Emilia, but Ram intervenes and convinces them to leave. During the evacuation, Felix discovers a merchant is part of the Witch's Cult and he self-destructs, knocking out Subaru. When Subaru wakes up, he realizes that the village is under attack by the Witch's Cult and that the Archbishop of Sloth's power can be transferred to other Fingers who are among the merchants. Wilhelm is severely injured fighting the final Finger, until Emilia shows up and defeats him by encasing him in ice. After the battle, when Ia suddenly abandons Subaru, he panics and runs into the forest. Felix and Julius chase after him, but Subaru's body becomes possessed by Petelgeuse. Subaru fights back long enough to ask Felix and Julius to kill him. They reluctantly agree, and Julius cuts him down, as Emilia back in the village hears a noise in the distance.
24	24	"The Self-Proclaimed Knight and the Greatest Knight"; Transliteration: "Jishō Kishi to Saiyū no Kishi" (Japanese: 自称騎士と最優の騎士)	Yoshito Mikamo	Yoshiko Nakamura	Yoshikazu Miyao	September 12, 2016
With Subaru's death, he surprisingly resets back to the strategy meeting on the morning after the White Whale battle. Now aware that the cult can possess others, he formulates a new strategy to take out the fingers first before going after Petelgeuse himself. Wilhelm drops by the mansion to clear up the misunderstanding and to order the evacuation of the village. Then Subaru, wearing a cloak to mask his presence, arrives to tell Emilia that an attack is imminent and convince her to follow through with the evacuation. Knowing that there are spies among the merchants, Subaru hands out the plan of evacuation that is two hours behind schedule and the spy is apprehended. In addition, Subaru's allies rescue Otto from captivity by the Witch Cult. Subaru approaches Petelgeuse at his hideout offering to go through the ordeal to join the cult and become a new vessel. When Subaru is asked to show his Gospel, he shows the metia he took from the spy to commence the surprise attack. Subaru runs, with Petelgeuse and the remaining fingers in pursuit. Mimi and Tivey arrive to take out the fingers, and Subaru draws Petelgeuse towards the bottom of the cliff which he jumped off in a past timeline. Julius arrives and attacks Petelgeuse, helped by Subaru's ability to see the Unseen Hands.
25	25	"That's All This Story Is About"; Transliteration: "Tada Soredakeno Monogatari" (Japanese: ただそれだけの物語)	Masaharu Watanabe	Masahiro Yokotani	Masaharu Watanabe	September 19, 2016
Julius fights Petelgeuse utilizing spirit arts to see the Unseen Hands through Subaru's eyes. Petelgeuse attempts to once more gain control over Subaru's body. This time, however, Subaru speaks out his "Return by Death" to have Petelgeuse come in contact with the spirit of Satella, and, upon being rejected by the witch, Petelgeuse loses control over Subaru, flees back to his old body, and is finally killed. On returning to the main group, Subaru learns that explosives are stowed in the wagon carrying Emilia and the children. Otto offers to take Subaru and reach Emilia in time to save her. Petelgeuse makes a surprise return, his body held together by the Unseen Hands. Subaru sets Petelgeuse on fire using Julius' spirit Ia, then writes "the end" in his Gospel book after which, Petelgeuse finally dies for good. Reaching Emilia's wagon in time, Subaru finds the explosives under the floor, then carries them on Patrasche to the carcass of the White Whale at the base of the Flugel Tree, throwing them inside. He is rendered unconscious from the massive blast when the explosives detonate, but is shielded by his dragon. Hours later, Subaru awakens in Emilia's lap, and explains his feelings and reasons for wanting to save her even as she says she has done nothing for him. When he confesses his love for her, Emilia, crying tears of joy, thanks Subaru for saving her.

== Home media release ==
=== Japanese ===
Kadokawa Corporation (Japan – Region 2/A)
Vol.	Episodes	Break Time	Re:Petit	Cover art	Release date	Ref.
1	1–2	1–2	—N/a	Emilia and Puck	June 24, 2016	
2	3–5	3–5	—N/a	Rem and Ram	July 27, 2016	
3	6–8	6–8	—N/a	Beatrice	August 24, 2016	
4	9–11	9–11	—N/a	Natsuki Subaru and Rem	September 28, 2016	
5	12–14	—N/a	1–3	Felt	October 26, 2016	
6	15–17	—N/a	4–6	Priscilla Barielle	November 25, 2016	
7	18–20	—N/a	7–9	Crusch Karsten	December 21, 2016	
8	21–23	—N/a	10–12	Anastasia Hoshin	January 25, 2017	
9	24–25	—N/a	13–14	Natsuki Subaru and Emilia	February 24, 2017	
Box	1–25	1–11	1–14	Rem and Emilia	May 27, 2020	

=== English ===
Crunchyroll, LLC (North America – Region 1/A)
Part		Episodes	Break Time	Re:Petit	Release date	Ref.
Season 1	1	1–12	1–11	—N/a	June 19, 2018	
Season 1	2	13–25	—N/a	1–14	February 5, 2019	
