= Stable storage =

Computer data storage that guarantees atomicity

Stable storage is a classification of computer data storage technology that guarantees atomicity for any given write operation and allows software to be written that is robust against some hardware and power failures. To be considered atomic, upon reading back a just written-to portion of the disk, the storage subsystem must return either the write data or the data that was on that portion of the disk before the write operations.

Most computer disk drives are not considered stable storage because they do not guarantee atomic write; an error could be returned upon subsequent read of the disk where it was just written to in lieu of either the new or prior data.

== Implementation ==
Multiple techniques have been developed to achieve the atomic property from weakly atomic devices such as disks. Writing data to a disk in two places in a specific way is one technique and can be done by application software.

Most often though, stable storage functionality is achieved by mirroring data on separate disks via RAID technology (level 1 or greater). The RAID controller implements the disk writing algorithms that enable separate disks to act as stable storage.

== See also ==
- Hard disk failure
