= Record locking =

Solution for concurrent database access

Record locking is the technique of preventing simultaneous access to data in a database, to prevent inconsistent results.

The classic example is demonstrated by two bank clerks attempting to update the same bank account for two different transactions. Clerks 1 and 2 both retrieve (i.e., copy) the account's record. Clerk 1 applies and saves a transaction. Clerk 2 applies a different transaction to his saved copy, and saves the result, based on the original record and his changes, overwriting the transaction entered by clerk 1. The record no longer reflects the first transaction, as if it had never taken place.

A simple way to prevent this is to lock the file whenever a record is being modified by any user, so that no other user can save data. This prevents records from being overwritten incorrectly, but allows only one record to be processed at a time, locking out other users who need to edit records at the same time.

To allow several users to edit a database table at the same time and also prevent inconsistencies created by unrestricted access, a single record can be locked when retrieved for editing or updating. Anyone attempting to retrieve the same record for editing is denied write access because of the lock (although, depending on the implementation, they may be able to view the record without editing it). Once the record is saved or edits are canceled, the lock is released. Records can never be saved so as to overwrite other changes, preserving data integrity.

In database management theory, locking is used to implement isolation among multiple database users. This is the "I" in the acronym ACID.

A thorough and authoritative description of locking was written by Jim Gray.

== Granularity of locks ==
If the bank clerks (to follow the illustration above) are serving two customers, but their accounts are contained in one ledger, then the entire ledger, or one or more database tables, would need to be made available for editing to the clerks in order for each to complete a transaction, one at a time (file locking). While safe, this method can cause unnecessary waiting.

If the clerks can remove one page from the ledger, containing the account of the current customer (plus several other accounts), then multiple customers can be serviced concurrently, provided that each customer's account is found on a different page than the others. If two customers have accounts on the same page, then only one may be serviced at a time. This is analogous to a page-level lock in a database.

A higher degree of granularity is achieved if each individual account may be taken by a clerk. This would allow any customer to be serviced without waiting for another customer who is accessing a different account. This is analogous to a record-level lock and is normally the highest degree of locking granularity in a database management system.

In a SQL database, a record is typically called a "row".

The introduction of granular (subset) locks creates the possibility for a situation called deadlock. Deadlock is possible when incremental locking (locking one entity, then locking one or more additional entities) is used. To illustrate, if two bank customers asked two clerks to obtain their account information so they could transfer some money into other accounts, the two accounts would essentially be locked. Then, if the customers told their clerks that the money was to be transferred into each other's accounts, the clerks would search for the other accounts but find them to be "in use" and wait for them to be returned. Unknowingly, the two clerks are waiting for each other, and neither of them can complete their transaction until the other gives up and returns the account. Various techniques are used to avoid such problems.

== Use of locks ==
Record locks need to be managed between the entities requesting the records such that no entity is given too much service via successive grants, and no other entity is effectively locked out. The entities that request a lock can be either individual applications (programs) or an entire processor.

The application or system should be designed such that any lock is held for the shortest time possible. Data reading, without editing facilities, does not require a lock, and reading locked records is usually permissible.

Two main types of locks can be requested:

=== Exclusive locks ===
Exclusive locks are exclusively held by a single entity, usually for the purpose of writing to the record. If the locking schema was represented by a list, the holder list would contain only one entry. Since this type of lock effectively blocks any other entity that requires the lock from processing, care must be used to:

- ensure the lock is held for the shortest time possible;
- not hold the lock across system or function calls where the entity is no longer running on the processor – this can lead to deadlock;
- ensure that if the entity is unexpectedly exited for any reason, the lock is freed.

Non-holders of the lock (a.k.a. waiters) can be held in a list that is serviced in a round-robin fashion, or in a FIFO queue. This would ensure that any possible waiter would get equal chance to obtain the lock and not be locked out. To further speed up the process, if an entity has gone to sleep waiting for a lock, performance is improved if the entity is notified of the grant, instead of discovering it on some sort of system timeout driven wake-up.

=== Shared locks ===
Shared locks differ from exclusive locks in that the holder list can contain multiple entries. Shared locks allow all holders to read the contents of the record knowing that the record cannot be changed until after the lock has been released by all holders. Exclusive locks cannot be obtained when a record is already locked (exclusively or shared) by another entity.

If lock requests for the same entity are queued, then once a shared lock is granted, any queued shared locks may also be granted. If an exclusive lock is found next on the queue, it must wait until all shared locks have been released. As with exclusive locks, these shared locks should be held for the least time possible.

== See also ==
- Multiversion concurrency control (MVCC)
- Readers–writer lock
