= Rollback (data management) =

Database operation that restores a previous state

In database technologies, a rollback is an operation which returns the database to some previous state. Rollbacks are important for database integrity, because they mean that the database can be restored to a clean copy even after erroneous operations are performed. They are crucial for recovering from database server crashes; by rolling back any transaction which was active at the time of the crash, the database is restored to a consistent state.

The rollback feature is usually implemented with a transaction log, but can also be implemented via multiversion concurrency control.

== Cascading rollback ==
A cascading rollback occurs in database systems when a transaction (T1) causes a failure and a rollback must be performed. Other transactions dependent on T1's actions must also be rollbacked due to T1's failure, thus causing a cascading effect. That is, one transaction's failure causes many to fail.

Practical database recovery techniques guarantee cascadeless rollback, therefore a cascading rollback is not a desirable result. Cascading rollback is scheduled by dba.

== SQL ==
SQL refers to Structured Query Language, a kind of language used to access, update and manipulate database. In SQL, ROLLBACK is a command that causes all data changes since the last START TRANSACTION or BEGIN to be discarded by the relational database management systems (RDBMS), so that the state of the data is "rolled back" to the way it was before those changes were made.

A ROLLBACK statement will also release any existing savepoints that may be in use.

In most SQL dialects, ROLLBACKs are connection specific. This means that if two connections are made to the same database, a ROLLBACK made in one connection will not affect any other connections. This is vital for proper concurrency.

== Usage outside databases ==
Rollbacks are not exclusive to databases: any stateful distributed system may use rollback operations to maintain consistency. Examples of distributed systems that can support rollbacks include message queues and workflow management systems. More generally, any operation that resets a system to its previous state before another operation or series of operations can be viewed as a rollback.

== See also ==
- Savepoint
- Commit
- Undo
- Schema migration
