= Spin lock =

Spin lock may refer to:

- Spin lock, a part of artillery fuze mechanism which arms the munition upon firing
- Spinlock, a concept in multithread programming
