= CAS2 (disambiguation) =

CAS2 is an airport code for Moose Lake (Lodge) Airport.

CAS2 may refer to:

- Double compare-and-swap, in computers, machine level instruction
- CAS Latency, Column Access Strobe, a timing associated with some kinds of computer memory
- cas2, CRISPR-associated protein 2
