= Ultracomputer =

American processor design

The New York University's Ultracomputer is a significant processor design in the history of parallel computing. The system has N processors, N memories, and an N log N message-passing switch connecting them. The system supported an innovative fetch-and-add process coordination instruction, and the custom VLSI network switches could combine references (including fetch-and-adds) from several processors into a single reference, to reduce memory contention.

The machine was developed in the 1980s at the Courant Institute of Mathematical Sciences Computer Science Department, based on a concept developed by Jacob T. Schwartz. Most of the work done was theoretical, but two prototypes were built:

- An 8-processor bus-based machine
- A 16-processor, 16 memory-module machine with custom VLSI switches supporting the fetch-and-add instruction.

Ultracomputer technology was the basis for the IBM Research Research Parallel Processor Prototype (RP3), an experimental parallel computer that supported 512 processing nodes. A 64-node system was built at the Thomas J. Watson Research Center in the late 1980s.
