= Busy waiting =

Continuously checking a condition in computing

In computer science and software engineering, busy-waiting, busy-looping or spinning is a technique in which a process repeatedly checks to see if a condition is true, such as whether keyboard input or a lock is available. Spinning can also be used to generate an arbitrary time delay, a technique that was necessary on systems that lacked a method of waiting a specific length of time. Processor speeds vary greatly from computer to computer, especially as some processors are designed to dynamically adjust speed based on current workload. Consequently, spinning as a time-delay technique can produce inconsistent or even unpredictable results on different systems unless code is included to determine the time a processor takes to execute a "do nothing" loop, or the looping code explicitly checks a real-time clock.

In most cases, spinning is considered an anti-pattern and should be avoided, as processor time that could be used to execute a different task is instead wasted on useless activity. Spinning can be a valid strategy in certain circumstances, most notably in the implementation of spinlocks within operating systems designed to run on SMP systems.

== Example ==
The following Java code examples illustrate two threads that share a global integer i. The first thread uses busy-waiting to check for a change in the value of i:

package org.wikipedia.examples;

import java.util.concurrent.atomic.AtomicInteger;

public class Example {
    // Atomic integer shared across threads
    static AtomicInteger i = new AtomicInteger(0);

    public static void main(String[] args) throws InterruptedException {
        // Thread f1: waits for i to change from 0
        Thread t1 = new Thread(() -> {
            int local;
            while ((local = i.get()) == 0) {
                // Busy-wait (spinlock)
            }
            System.out.printf("i's value has changed to %d.%n", local);
        });

        // Thread f2: changes i after 10 seconds
        Thread t2 = new Thread(() -> {
            int local = 99;
            try {
                Thread.sleep(10_000); // sleep 10 seconds
            } catch (InterruptedException e) {
                Thread.currentThread().interrupt();
                return;
            }
            i.set(local);
            System.out.printf("t2 has changed the value of i to %d.%n", local);
        });

        // Start threads
        t1.start();
        t2.start();

        // Wait for threads to finish
        t1.join();
        t2.join();

        System.out.println("All threads finished.");
    }
}

In a use case like this, one can consider using condition variables as well.

== Alternatives ==
Most operating systems and threading libraries provide a variety of system calls that will block the process on an event, such as lock acquisition, timer changes, I/O availability or signals. Using such calls generally produces the simplest, most efficient, fair, and race-free result. A single call checks, informs the scheduler of the event it is waiting for, inserts a memory barrier where applicable, and may perform a requested I/O operation before returning. Other processes can use the CPU while the caller is blocked. The scheduler is given the information needed to implement priority inheritance or other mechanisms to avoid starvation.

Busy-waiting itself can be made much less wasteful by using a delay function (e.g., sleep()) found in most operating systems. This puts a thread to sleep for a specified time, during which the thread will waste no CPU time. If the loop is checking something simple then it will spend most of its time asleep and will waste very little CPU time.

If the delay should be short, there is also often a function to simply yield the processor, giving up control to other processes, but not waiting for any time.

In programs that never end (such as operating systems), infinite busy waiting can be implemented by using unconditional jumps as shown by this NASM syntax:

jmp $

The CPU will unconditionally jump to its own position forever. A busy wait like this can be replaced with:

sleep:
hlt
jmp sleep

For more information, see HLT (x86 instruction).

== Appropriate usage ==
In low-level programming, busy-waits may actually be desirable. It may not be desirable or practical to implement interrupt-driven processing for every hardware device, particularly those that are seldom accessed. Sometimes it is necessary to write some sort of control data to hardware and then fetch device status resulting from the write operation, status that may not become valid until a number of machine cycles have elapsed following the write. The programmer could call an operating system delay function, but doing so may consume more time than would be expended in spinning for a few clock cycles waiting for the device to return its status.

== See also ==
- Polling (computer science)
- Non-blocking I/O
- BogoMips
- volatile variable
- Synchronization (computer science)
- Peterson's algorithm
