= Uniprocessor system =

Computer system with one CPU

A uniprocessor system is defined as a computer system that has a single central processing unit that is used to execute computer tasks. As more and more modern software is able to make use of multiprocessing architectures, such as SMP and MPP, the term uniprocessor is therefore used to distinguish the class of computers where all processing tasks share a single CPU. As such, this kind of system uses a type of architecture that is based on a single computing unit. All operations (additions, multiplications, etc.) are thus done sequentially on the unit.
