= Computer science (disambiguation) =

Computer science is the study of computation, information, and automation.

It may also refer to:

- Computer Sciences Corporation, the predecessor of DXC Technology
- Computer Science (journal), a peer-reviewed scientific journal
- Computer Science (UIL), an academic event in Texas
