= Bolesław Szymański (scientist) =

- Born: 22 April 1950 (age 74); Pasłęk, Poland
- Education: Warsaw University of Technology and Polish Academy of Sciences
- Occupation: Computer scientist
- Employer: Rensselaer Polytechnic Institute
- Known for: Significant contributions to parallel computing, distributed computing and networking Szymański's algorithm
- Title: Claire and Roland Schmitt Distinguished Professor of Computer Science
- Website: http://www.cs.rpi.edu/~szymansk

Bolesław Karol Szymański (born 22 April 1950 in Pasłęk) is the Claire and Roland Schmitt Distinguished Professor at the Department of Computer Science and the Founding Head of the Center for Network Science and Technology, Rensselaer Polytechnic Institute. He is known for multiple contributions to computer science, including Szymański's algorithm.

== Current Work ==
Szymański is the Director of the Social Cognitive Networks Academic Research Center, which studies the fundamentals of social and cognitive network science; the center is a part of the Network Science Collaborative Technology Alliance funded by the United States Army. He is also the Principal Investigator in the International Technology Alliance. His projects include dynamic processes on networks, hidden groups in social networks, sensor network protocols and algorithms, and large-scale parallel and distributed computing and simulation. He received ITA Distinguished Service Award in 2007. Szymański is also one of the Principals in the MilkyWay@home project that seeks to model the streams of stars in the Milky Way Galaxy that were pulled from nearby galaxies (e.g. Saggitarius). Szymański was also a visiting professor at University of Pennsylvania, Stanford University, and Wrocław University of Technology and a member of the Kosciuszko Foundation Collegium of Eminent Scientists of Polish Origin and Ancestry.

== Current Positions ==
His current positions (Jan 2011) are :

- Claire and Roland W. Schmitt Distinguished Professor] of Computer Science
- Director, Social Cognitive Networks Academic Research Center
- Director, the Rensselaer Center for Network Science and Technology (NEST)
- Foreign Member, Polish Academy of Sciences
- Editor-in-Chief, Scientific Programming
- Editorial Board, Scalable Computing: Practice and Experience
- Editorial Board, Computing and Informatics
- Editorial Board, Computer Science (journal)

== Education ==
In 1968, Szymański won Gold Medal at the X International Mathematical Olympiad in Moscow, USSR. He received his Ph.D. in computer science from Institute of Informatics of PAN, Warsaw in 1976. He pursued an academic career at Warsaw University of Technology, University of Aberdeen, and University of Pennsylvania. He has been with Rensselaer Polytechnic Institute, Troy. NY, since 1985. In 1999, Szymański was elected an IEEE Fellow for his contributions to parallel computing and distributed computing and in 2003 he received the Wiley Distinguished Faculty Award. In 2007, Szymański received the Claire and Roland W. Schmitt Distinguished Professorship at Rensselaer Polytechnic Institute. In 2009, Szymański received the Wilkes Award and Medal for the best paper published in volume 52 of Computer Journal. Also, in 2009, he was elected a foreign member of the Polish Academy of Sciences and joined Division IV of Technical Sciences there.
