= Eisenberg & McGuire algorithm =

Solution to the critical section problem

The Eisenberg & McGuire algorithm is an algorithm for solving the critical sections problem, a general version of the dining philosophers problem. It was described in 1972 by Murray A. Eisenberg and Michael R. McGuire.

== Algorithm ==
All the n-processes share the following variables:

enum pstate = {IDLE, WAITING, ACTIVE};
pstate flags[n];
int turn;

The variable turn is set arbitrarily to a number between 0 and n−1 at the start of the algorithm.

The flags variable for each process is set to WAITING whenever it intends to enter the critical section. flags takes either IDLE or WAITING or ACTIVE.

Initially the flags variable for each process is initialized to IDLE.

    repeat {

		/* announce that we need the resource */
		flags[i] := WAITING;

		/* scan processes from the one with the turn up to ourselves. */
		/* repeat if necessary until the scan finds all processes idle */
		index := turn;
		while (index != i) {
			if (flags[index] != IDLE) index := turn;
			else index := (index+1) mod n;
		}

		/* now tentatively claim the resource */
		flags[i] := ACTIVE;

		/* find the first active process besides ourselves, if any */
		index := 0;
		while ((index < n) && ((index = i) || (flags[index] != ACTIVE))) {
			index := index+1;
		}

	   /* if there were no other active processes, AND if we have the turn
	   or else whoever has it is idle, then proceed.  Otherwise, repeat
	   the whole sequence. */
    } until ((index >= n) && ((turn = i) || (flags[turn] = IDLE)));

    /* Start of CRITICAL SECTION */

	/* claim the turn and proceed */
	turn := i;

    /* Critical Section Code of the Process */

    /* End of CRITICAL SECTION */

    /* find a process which is not IDLE */
	/* (if there are no others, we will find ourselves) */
	index := (turn+1) mod n;
	while (flags[index] = IDLE) {
		index := (index+1) mod n;
	}

	/* give the turn to someone that needs it, or keep it */
	turn := index;

	/* we're finished now */
	flags[i] := IDLE;

    /* REMAINDER Section */

== See also ==
- Dekker's algorithm
- Peterson's algorithm
- Lamport's bakery algorithm
- Szymański's algorithm
- Semaphores
