= Dietmar Damerau =

German artist

Dietmar Damerau (September 22, 1935 – October 22, 2011) was a German artist who lived most years of his life in Greece.

== Life ==
Dietmar was born in Preußisch Holland, East Prussia in 1935. When he was 10 years old, on January 22, 1945, Dietmar, his mother and his three siblings fled their hometown in an abandoned Wehrmacht vehicle, with three other families fleeing the allied bombing of Berlin. They stopped in many European cities, that had been recently bombed such as Hamburg, Dresden, Prague, Styria, Salzburg and Coburg, eventually settling in Munich. During the next few years, and after the war had ended, he learned typesetting in Passau at the "Neue Passauer Presse". There he met teacher and friend Otto Sammer whom he worked with many times over the years. He remained in the art world and continued his studies at the Academy of Graphic Arts in Munich. He was forced to quit his studies due to a serious accident in Seville, Spain where he spent 2 years recovering in the hospital. In the early 1960s he moved to the island of Crete in Greece, where he settled, and lived for many years. In 1967, he was married and had one son, two years later. Later on, he was forced by the military Junta to leave Greece – moving to Sardinia. After the fall of the Junta, he returned to Crete. Extensive tourist development on the island caused him to want to leave again, at which point he moved to the small village of Lafkos on the mountain of Pelion, where he built a home and studio, beginning to paint and to create sculptures once again. He spent many years living in Lafkos, in various places in Upper Bavaria and Denmark. He lived a solitary, yet creative life, producing a high volume of artwork. He died at Volos hospital at the age of 76, on October 22, 2011.

== Work ==
His work consists of a wide range of media, including drawing, painting, printmaking and sculpture. He composed his art using an array of materials, from the conventional oil paint and gouache to anything he could get his hands on, such as driftwood, trash, lipstick and coffee grinds. He exhibited in various European cities such as Copenhagen, Athens, Berlin and Munich among others and was a member of the Künstlergilde Esslingen since 1976. His largest painting is one covering a 106 square metre ceiling in a private home in Lafkos, which took him 3 years to complete.
