= Joachim Friedrich Henckel =

Prussian surgeon (1712–1779)

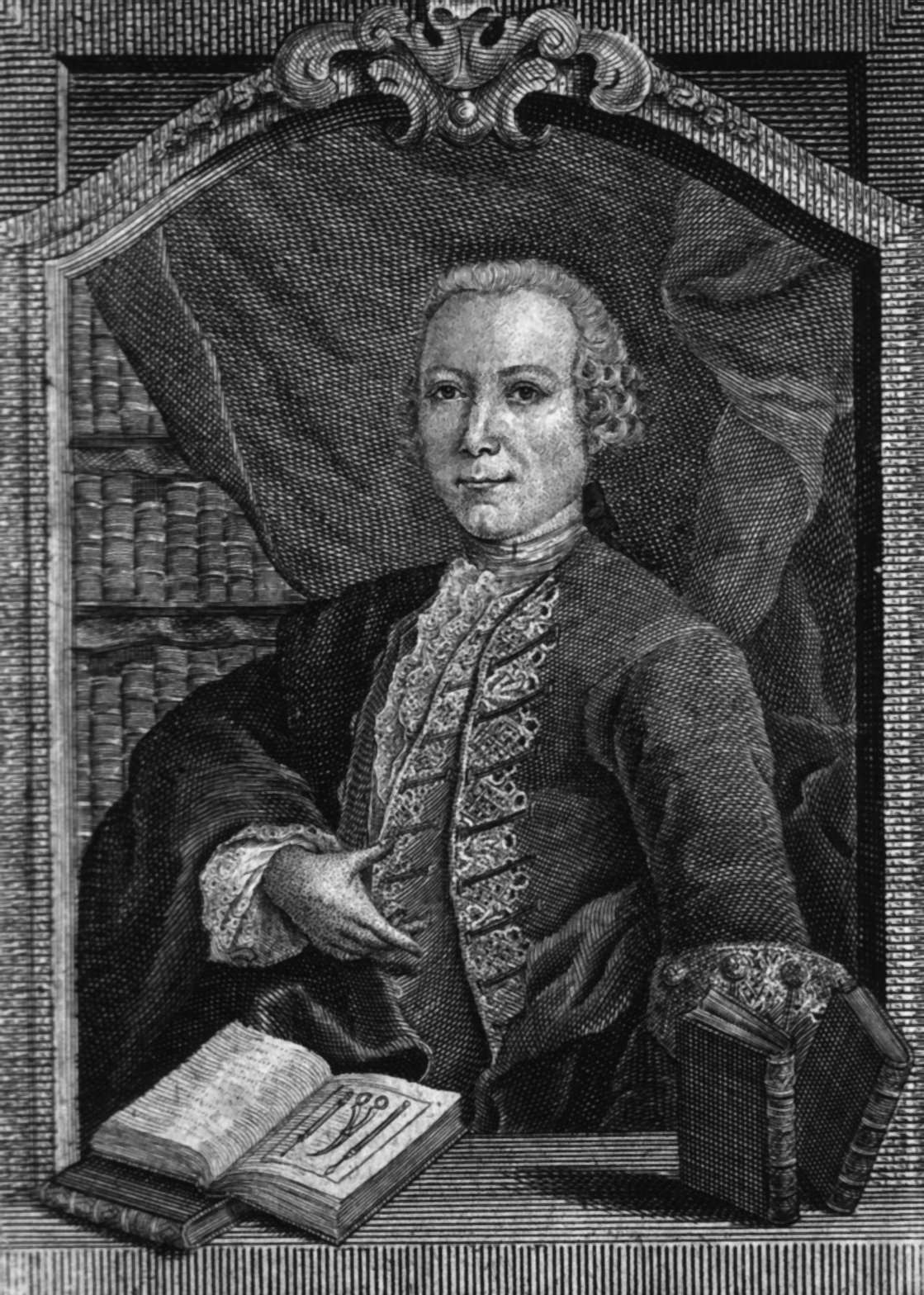
Joachim Friedrich Henckel

Joachim Friedrich Henckel (4 March 1712 in Preussisch Holland – 1 July 1779) was a Prussian surgeon at Charité hospital in Berlin.

His publications include Medical and Surgical Observations (1744).

In 1769, Henckel conducted the first caesarean section to incise the linea alba on a living woman. The child survived, though the mother later died, probably due to peritonitis. The surgery drew so much attention that King Frederick II named Henckel professor of surgery and a Court Counselor. From 1773 to 1779, Henckel served as director of the Charité.
