= Network Science CTA =

The Network Science Collaborative Technology Alliance (NS CTA) is a collaborative research alliance funded by the US Army Research Laboratory (ARL) and focused on fundamental research on the critical scientific and technical challenges that emerge from the close interdependence of several genres of networks such as social/cognitive, information, and communications networks. The primary goal of the NS CTA is to deeply understand the underlying commonalities among these intertwined networks, and, by understanding, improve our ability to analyze, predict, design, and influence complex systems interweaving many kinds of networks.

This emerging research domain, termed network science, also has the potential to accelerate understanding of each genre of network by cross-fertilization of insights, theories, algorithms, and approaches and by expanding their study into the larger context of the multi-genre (or composite) network environments within which each must act.

== NS CTA ==
The NS CTA is an alliance between ARL, other government researchers, and a consortium of four research centers: an Academic Research Center (ARC) focused on social/cognitive networks (the SCNARC), an ARC focused on information networks (the INARC), an ARC focused on communications networks (the CNARC), and an Interdisciplinary Research Center (the IRC) focused on interdisciplinary research and technology transition. Overall, these centers include roughly one hundred PhD-level researchers from about 30 universities and industrial research labs, engaged with as many graduate students and interns. The Alliance unites research across organizations and research disciplines to address the critical technical challenges faced by the Army in a world where all missions are embedded in and depend upon many genres of networks. The expected impact of its transdisciplinary research includes greatly enhanced human performance for network-embedded missions and greatly enhanced speed and precision for complex military operations. Beyond this vital focus, its research is also expected to accelerate the reach and depth of our understanding of the interwoven networks that so profoundly influence all our lives.

The Alliance conducts interdisciplinary research in network science and transitions the results of this fundamental research to address the technical challenges of network-embedded Army operations. The NS CTA research program exploits intellectual synergies across its disciplines by uniting fundamental and applied network science research in parallel. It drives the synergistic combination of these technical areas for network-centric and network-enabling capabilities in support of all missions required of today's military forces, including humanitarian support, peacekeeping, and combat operations in any kind of terrain, but especially in complex and urban settings. It also supports and stimulates dual-use applications of this research and resulting technology to benefit commercial use.

As a critical element of this program, the Alliance has created a network science research facility in Cambridge, MA, as well as shared distributed experimental resources throughout the Alliance. The NS CTA also serves the Army's technical needs through an education component, which acts to increase the pool of network science expertise in the Army and the nation while bringing greater awareness of Army technical challenges into the academic and industrial network science research community. In association with the NS CTA research program, there is a separate technology transition component that provides a contractual vehicle for other organizations to fund work focused on transitioning scientific and technical advances into more specific applications.

Research projects in the NS CTA are by design, highly collaborative and multi-disciplinary, whether based in one of the three academic research centers, the interdisciplinary research center, or one of the two cross-cutting research initiatives (CCRI).

== Core Research Program ==
=== Communication Networks Academic Research Center (CNARC) ===
The CNARC's research is focused on characterizing complex communications networks, such as those used for network-centric warfare and operations, so that their behavior can be predicted accurately and networks can be configured for optimal information sharing and gathering. In particular, the CNARC will focus on characterizing and controlling the operational information content capacity (OICC) of a tactical network. OICC is a function of the quality and amount of information that is delivered to decision makers. This includes data delivery and security properties of the network. Thus, it is vastly different than other measures of network capacity that are traditionally modeled. In essence, the CNARC models treat the network as an information source.

=== Information Networks Academic Research Center (INARC) ===
INARC is aimed at developing the information network technologies required to improve the capabilities of the U.S. Army and providing users with reliable and actionable intelligence across the full spectrum of Network-Centric Operations. INARC will systematically develop the foundation, methodologies, algorithms, and implementations needed for effective, scalable, hierarchical, and most importantly, dynamic and resilient information networks for military applications. The center focuses on Distributed and Real Time Data Integration and Information Fusion; Scalable, Human-Centric Information Network System; and Knowledge Discovery in Information Networks.

=== Social/Cognitive Networks Academic Research Center (SCNARC) ===
The modern military increasingly needs to rely on bottom up network processes, as compared to top down hierarchic processes. How does the pattern of interactions within a military unit affect performance of tasks? What kinds of ties external to the Army are necessary to success? How can we use massive streams of data to detect adversarial networks? How can a social and cognitive network quickly extract the most meaningful information for the soldier and decision maker that is useful in all aspects of their operations from supporting humanitarian operations to force protection and full combat operations? These are but a sample of network-related questions with which the 21st century Army must wrestle. The long-term objective of the center is to advance the scientific understanding of how the social networks form, operate and evolve and how they affect the functioning of large, complex organizations such as the Army; how adversary networks hidden in large social networks can be detected, monitored or dissolved; and how human cognition directs and is impacted by the network-centric interactions. SCNARC will undertake research to gain a fundamental understanding of the underlying theory, as well as create scientific foundations for modeling, simulation, measurements, analysis, prediction, and influence of social/cognitive networks and their impact on the U.S. Army.

=== Interdisciplinary Research Center (IRC) ===
The IRC is focused on performing interdisciplinary research (both basic and applied) that spans the interests in the Alliance and leads to cross-cutting insights into network science and innovative technologies. The IRC transitions basic research from across the Consortium (its own and the ARCs’) into applied research, and, through the Technology Transition component, promotes the rapid transition of technology to meet the specific needs of a network-centric Army. The IRC leads the Education component as a cooperative program across all four centers. The IRC also operates the NS CTA facility, which supports and coordinates distributed collaborative research and experimentation.

Programmatically, the IRC is the leader of the Consortium, both intellectually (responsible for setting research directions for the four centers to ensure that research is focused on fundamental network science issues that are relevant to network-centric operations and the Army mission) and administratively (responsible for financial management and for tracking and reporting on the Consortium's work).

=== Cross-Cutting Research Issues (CCRI) ===
In addition to the core research, the NS CTA is investigating two research issues that fundamentally cut across the social/cognitive, information, and communications network genres.

==== Trust in Distributed Decision Making ====
The goal of the Trust CCRI is to enhance distributed decision making capabilities of the Army in the context of network-centric operations, in particular, for irregular warfare and counterinsurgency by understanding the role trust plays in composite networks that consist of large systems with complex interactions between communication, information, and social/cognitive networks. Adding to the complexity, trust itself can be highly dynamic with uni- and bi-directional relationships forming, adapting, and dissolving at multiple timescales. Our work directly addresses these dynamics from the propagation and staging of data in the network to support establishment of trust and the revocation of network privileges or use in situations of distrust.

Trust is contextual, and the degree of trust placed in a relationship can directly relate to factors that exist in each network type. Counterinsurgency and irregular warfare place significant demands on trusted tactical decision-making, as any number of social and cultural factors can influence relationships with the local population and governmental officials. Our work in developing models of trust in composite networks will identify these factors and develop trust metrics than expose utility versus risk in specific courses of action.

Trust is also a significant factor in how soldiers perceive and act upon information provided through tactical information systems. Our work in developing cognitive models of trust at the human-machine interface (HMI), models of corroboration for disambiguating data, and the use of argumentation as a mechanism to support automated trust reasoning will directly impact how we build trustworthy systems to convey information to the warfighter.

==== Evolving Dynamic Integrated Networks (EDIN) ====
The goal of the EDIN CCRI is to develop appropriate mathematical representations and models of dynamic, composite networks composed of social, information, and communication networks; and to establish theories for analyzing their behavior and predicting the evolution of specific properties of such networks over time. The objective of a tactical network may be viewed as delivering the right information at the right time to the right user (persons, applications, and systems) to enable timely and accurate decision-making and therefore, mission success. The tactical network is composed of multiple interacting networks: communications networks, information networks, command-and-control and other social networks. Understanding the structure of the component networks and the dynamics therein, and of the dynamic interactions between these networks is crucial to the design of robust interdisciplinary (or composite1) networks which is one of the primary goals of the NS CTA program.

The overall approach in EDIN is to mathematically characterize the rich interactions between composite networks (which may comprise multiple networks with varying levels of coupling between them), and the dynamics that occur within each network or across networks. Examples of key technical approaches within EDIN include the development of formal models for reasoning about interacting networks; development of a theory of composite graphs for modeling interacting networks; modeling and analysis of group behaviors using techniques ranging beyond traditional graph theory; development of community discovery algorithms; characterization of temporal graph properties; development of mathematically tractable tactical mobility models; development of theories of co-evolution of interacting networks, etc.

Modeling the evolution and dynamics of a network entails understanding both the structural properties of dynamic networks and understanding the dynamics of processes (or behaviors) of interest embedded in the network. Typically, the dynamics of network structure impacts certain processes (e.g., how information propagates through the network); but at the same time the dynamics of processes (or behaviors) may result in alteration of network structures. Therefore, gaining a fundamental understanding of such relationships under several kinds of network dynamics is of paramount importance for obtaining significant insights into the behavior and evolution of complex military networks as well as adversarial networks. EDIN will also investigate a particular type of network dynamics, i.e., mobility (not only of communication devices but also of human beings, information etc.), which is particularly important in the military network context.

=== Participating Institutions in the Alliance ===
- Army Research Laboratory
- CERDEC
- BBN Technologies (Principal member, IRC, and Consortium Lead). Center director: Dr. Will E. Leland.
- Pennsylvania State University (Principal member, CNARC). Center director: Prof. Thomas La Porta.
- University of Illinois, Urbana-Champaign (Principal member, INARC). Center director: Prof. Jiawei Han.
- Rensselaer Polytechnic Institute (Principal member, SCNARC). Center director: Prof. Boleslaw Szymanski.

There are approximately 30 institutions (universities and industrial R&D labs) involved in the NS CTA.

=== The NS CTA Facility ===
The NS CTA facility is located in Cambridge, Massachusetts in the campus of BBN Technologies.
