= Pasłęk =

Town in Warmian-Masurian Voivodeship, Poland

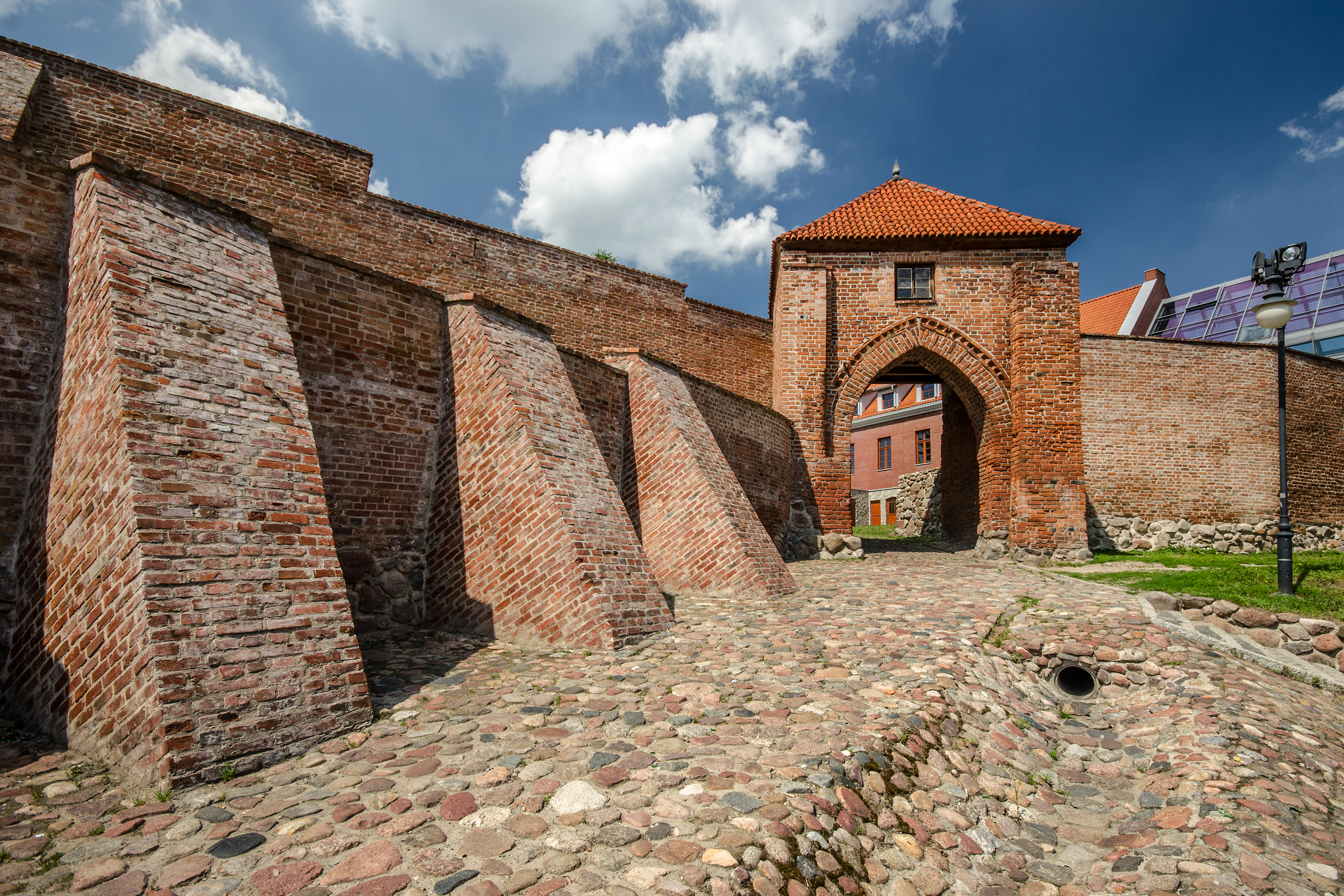
- Medieval town walls and the Mill Gate

- Flag Coat of arms

- Location within Poland
- Coordinates: 54°3′N 19°40′E
- Country: Poland
- Voivodeship: Warmian-Masurian
- County: Elbląg
- Gmina: Pasłęk
- Established: 13th century
- Town rights: 1297

Government
  - Mayor: Elżbieta Wasiuk

Area
  - Total: 11.39 km^{2} (4.40 sq mi)

Population (2017)
  - Total: 12,298
  - Density: 1,080/km^{2} (2,796/sq mi)
- Time zone: UTC+1 (CET)
  - Summer (DST): UTC+2 (CEST)
- Postal code: 14-400, 14-401, 14-402
- Area code: +48 55
- Vehicle registration: NEB
- Climate: Dfb
- Website: http://www.paslek.pl

Pasłęk (Note: Polish pronunciation: [ˈpaswɛŋk]; formerly known in Polish as Holąd Pruski; German: Preußisch Holland, pronounced [ˈpʁɔʏsɪʃ ˈhɔlant]; Old Prussian: Pāistlauks) is a historic town in northern Poland, within Elbląg County in the Warmian-Masurian Voivodeship. In 2017, the town had 12,298 registered inhabitants.

The town emerged at the location of a medieval stronghold in the 13th century, and notably was one of the first places of Dutch immigration in present-day Poland. Pasłęk contains preserved medieval Gothic architecture, including a town hall and defensive walls, a Gothic-Renaissance castle, and churches in Gothic, Renaissance and Gothic Revival styles. It is located near the S7 highway, connecting the Polish capital of Warsaw with the country's chief port city of Gdańsk.

== History ==
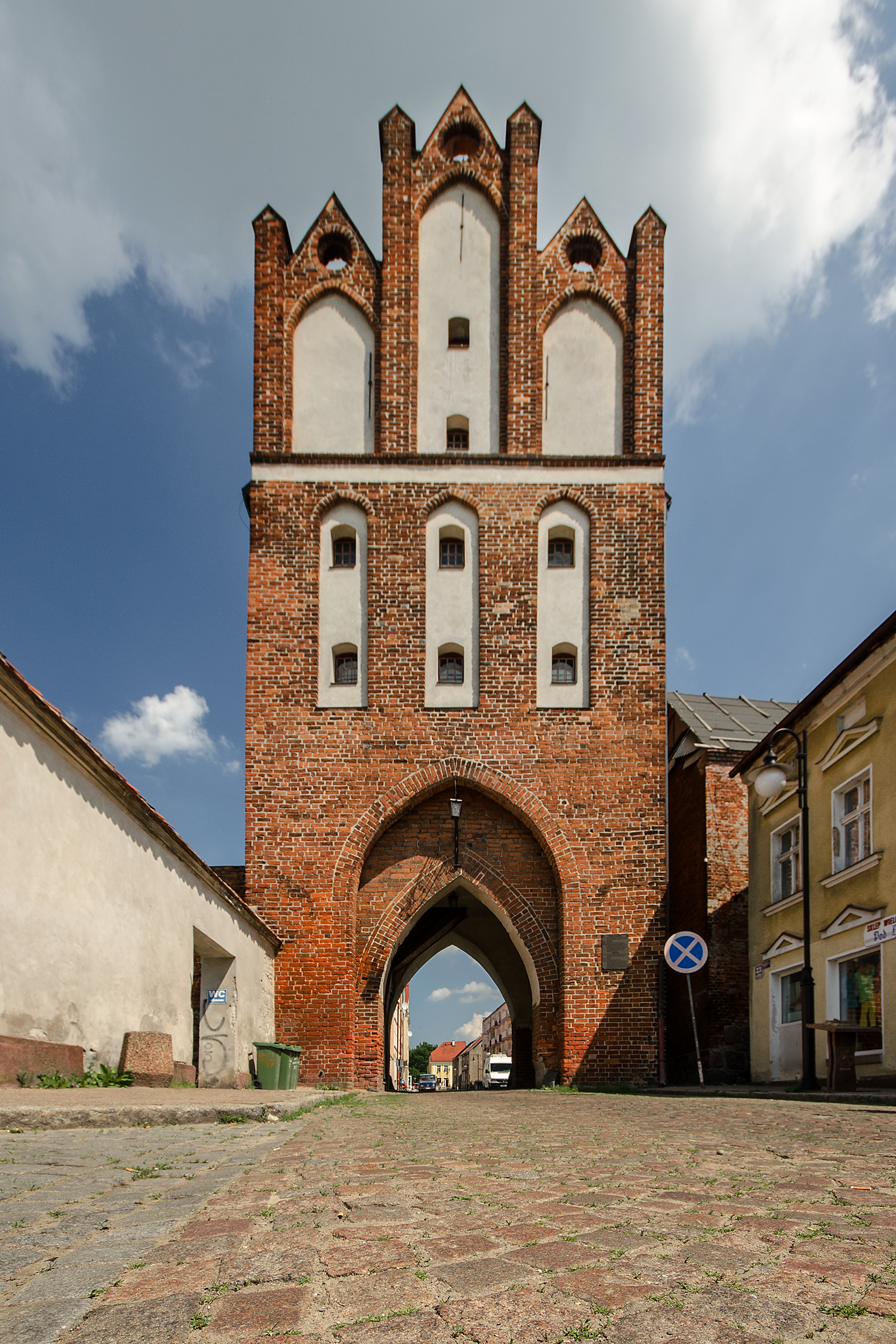
Gothic Stone Gate (Brama Kamienna)

The oldest record of the name of the Pasłęk territory appears as Pozolucensis provincia in a petition of Polish Dominicans to Pope Gregory IX from 1231. Later in the 13th and 14th century the settlement was mentioned in documents as Pazluch, Pazlok, Paslok. In 1393 it was mentioned by a frater Heinricus de Castro alias Pasloci. Pasłęk is one of two historic Polish names of the town and it derives from the Old Prussian place name Passis Lukis.

The second name is Holąd Pruski. The town in the place of the old settlement was founded by settlers imported from Holland by the Teutonic Order in the late 13th century — hence the name Hollant or Holland, later changed to Preußisch Holland, by adding the adjective Preußisch meaning "Prussian". It is the oldest former Dutch settlement in present-day Poland. It is located in the Prussian historical region of Pogesania.

After the Polish victory at the Battle of Grunwald in 1410, the castle was plundered by the retreating Teutonic Knights. Then it was taken over by Poles without a fight.

In 1440 the town joined the Prussian Confederation, at the request of which King Casimir IV Jagiellon signed the act of incorporation of the region to the Kingdom of Poland in 1454. The town joined Poland and recognized Polish rule. During the subsequent Thirteen Years’ War (1454–1466) it was briefly captured by the Teutonic Knights, but in 1456 it returned to Poland. The town was successfully defended against the Teutonic Knights in 1463 and 1466. After the peace treaty signed in Toruń in 1466, the town became part of Poland as a fief held by the Teutonic Order's state. During the last Polish–Teutonic War, which broke out after the newly chosen Grand Master of the Teutonic Order refused to submit to the Crown of Poland, the town was captured and held by the Poles from 1520 until the dissolution of the Teutonic state in 1525. Afterwards it became part of the secular Duchy of Prussia, a Polish fief until 1657. In 1526 a Lutheran parish was founded. In 1534 a town school was established.

In 1627 the town was captured by the Swedes and the next year it was captured by the Poles. In 1635, peace negotiations between Poland and Sweden took place in the town. In 1655 it was captured again by the Swedes. In 1659 it was besieged by Sweden again, but this time without success. It was the location of "The Great Sleigh Drive", a military operation in 1678. In 1688 a horse post service connecting Malbork with Königsberg (Kaliningrad) was led through the town. In 1735, a mission house was established by Jesuits from Braniewo. Between 1758 and 1762 it was under Russian occupation. In 1807 it was captured by Napoleonic troops. French troops were stationed in the town in 1807 and 1812. In 1818 Preußisch Holland became the seat of the district or county (landkreis) of the same name. In 1831 the town suffered a flood. In 1831, various Polish artillery units, engineer corps, sappers, honor guards and general staff of the November Uprising stopped in the town on the way to their internment places.

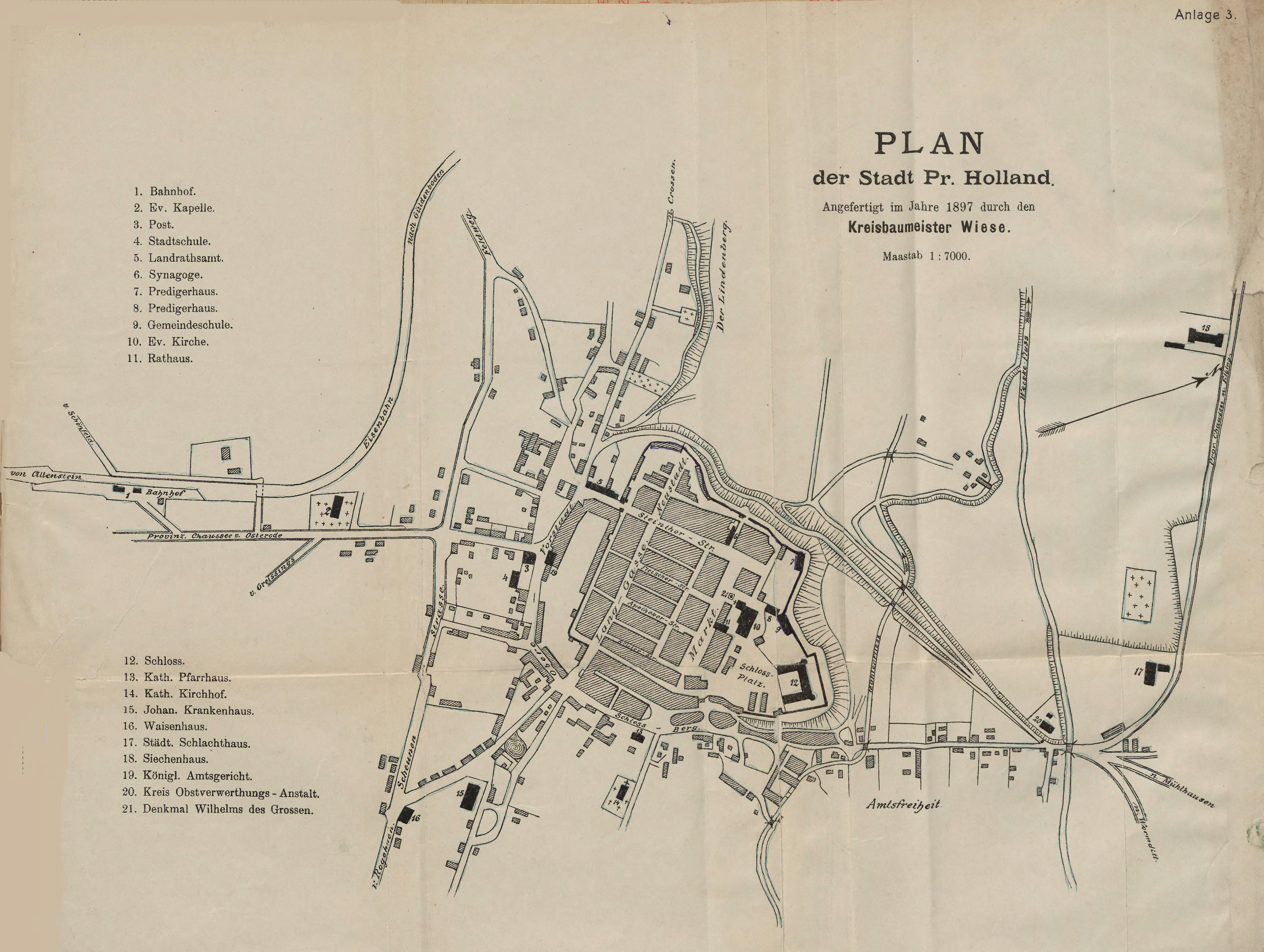
Map from 1897

Part of the Kingdom of Prussia since 1701, it became part of the German Empire in 1871. Following the defeat of Germany in the First World War and the Versailles Treaty the town remained the seat of Landkreis Preußisch Holland within Weimar Germany's exclave East Prussia. With the arrival of the Red Army on 23 January 1945, and the end of the war, the town again became part of Poland, although with a Soviet-installed communist regime, which stayed in power until the 1980s. It was handed over to Polish administration on 1 June 1945 and renamed to the historic Polish name Pasłęk on 7 May 1946. The remaining ethnic Germans were expelled in several transports within the following year, e.g. 149 people on 4 September and 89 on 4 October 1947. A transport of 80 children from an orphanage, many of them survivors of the Grünhagen railway accident or wartime evacuees, left in May 1947. As of 1950, 373 pre-war inhabitants lived in the area, a number reduced to 20 in 1958. The town was repopulated by Poles, many of whom displaced from the former eastern territories of Poland annexed by the Soviet Union.

In 1969, the "Pasłęczanka" Housing Cooperative was founded, which built the "Osiedle Ogrodowa" district. In 1975 an economic and technical school was opened.

== Sights ==
Among the historic heritage of Pasłęk are:

- medieval town walls with the Stone Gate (Brama Kamienna) and Mill Gate (Brama Młyńska)
- Gothic town hall (Ratusz)
- Gothic St. Bartholomew Church
- Pasłęk Castle
- Renaissance Saint George church
- Water tower
- Gothic Revival Church of the Nativity of Mary
- Old townhouses
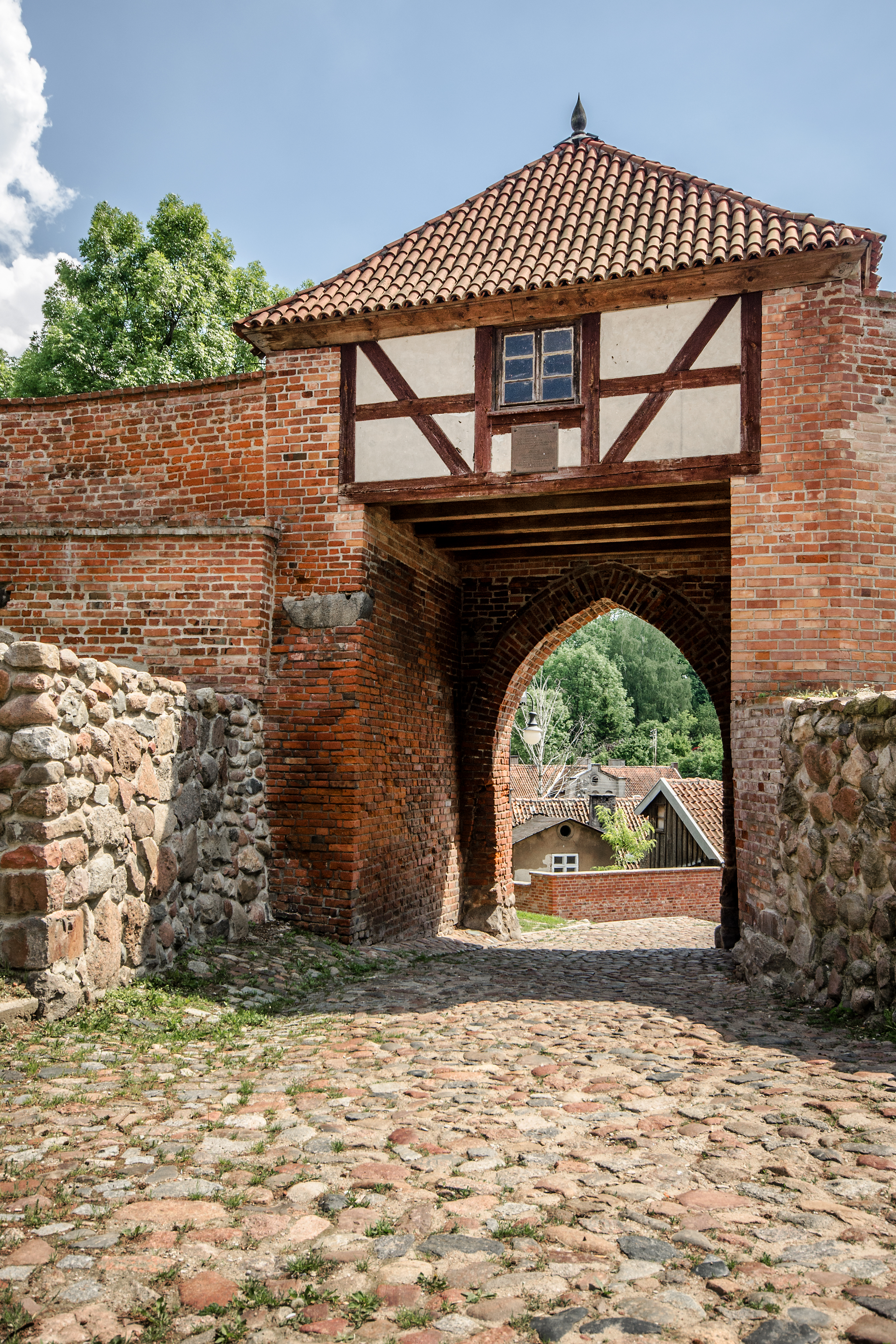
Mill Gate (Brama Młyńska)

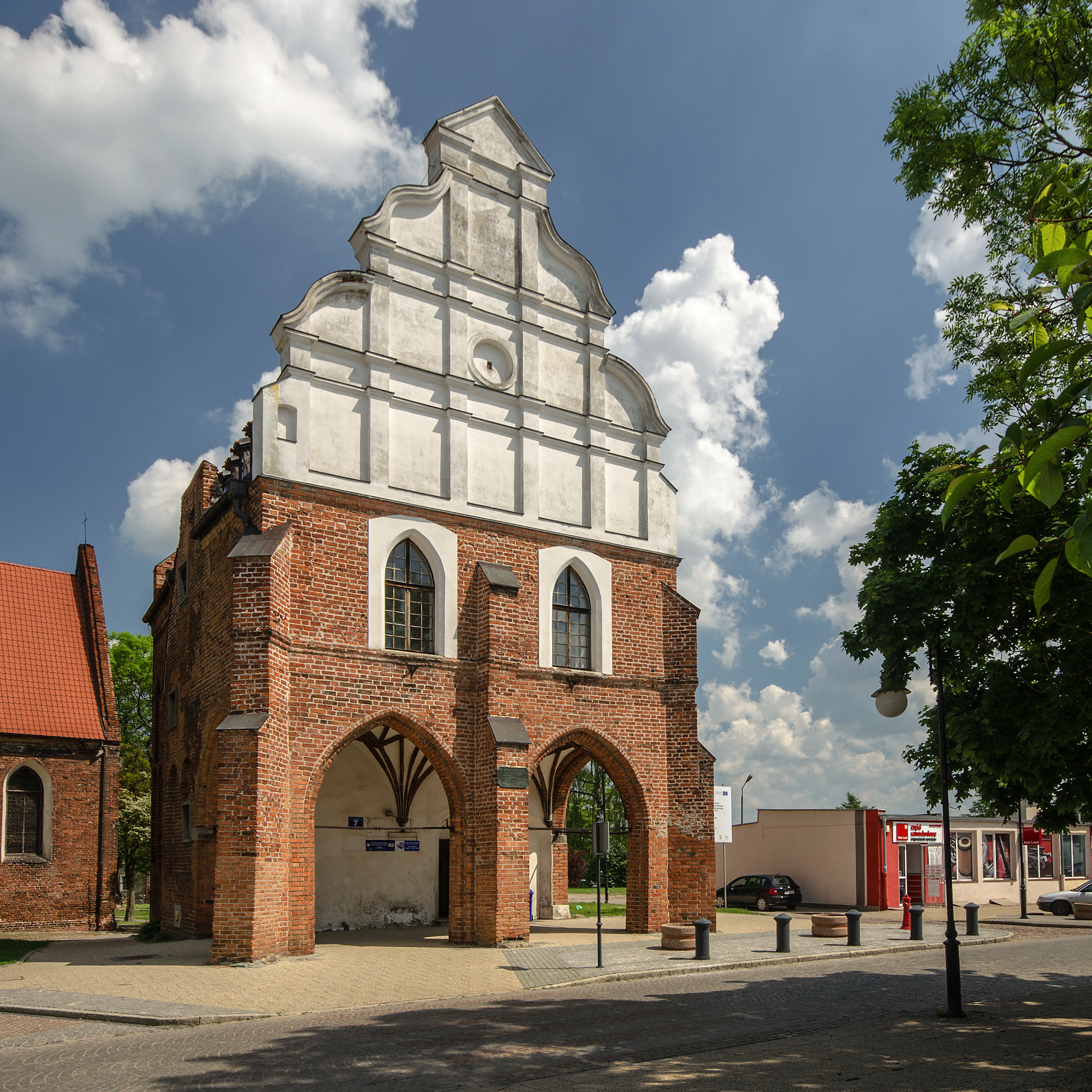
Gothic town hall (Ratusz)

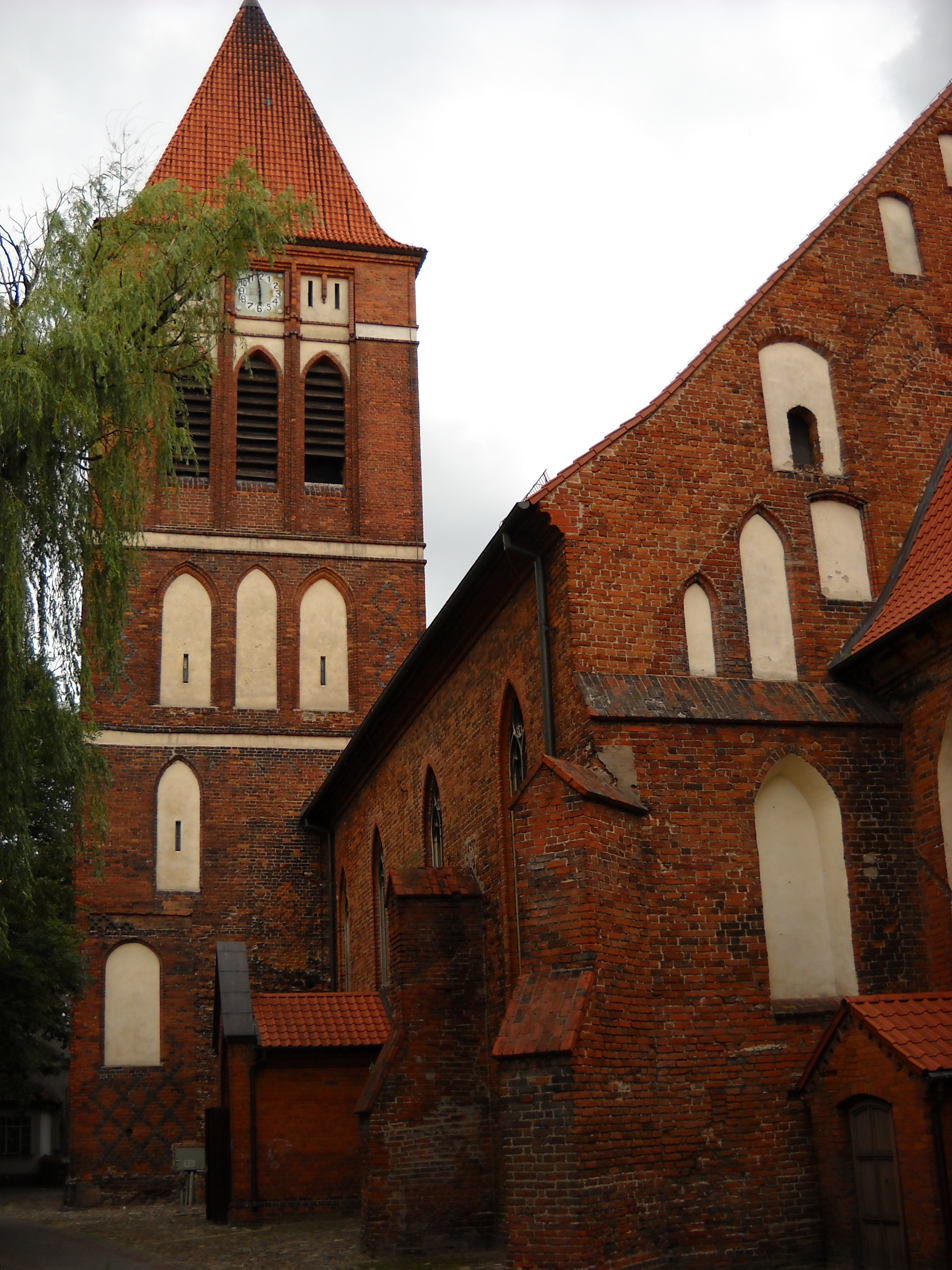
St. Bartholomew Church

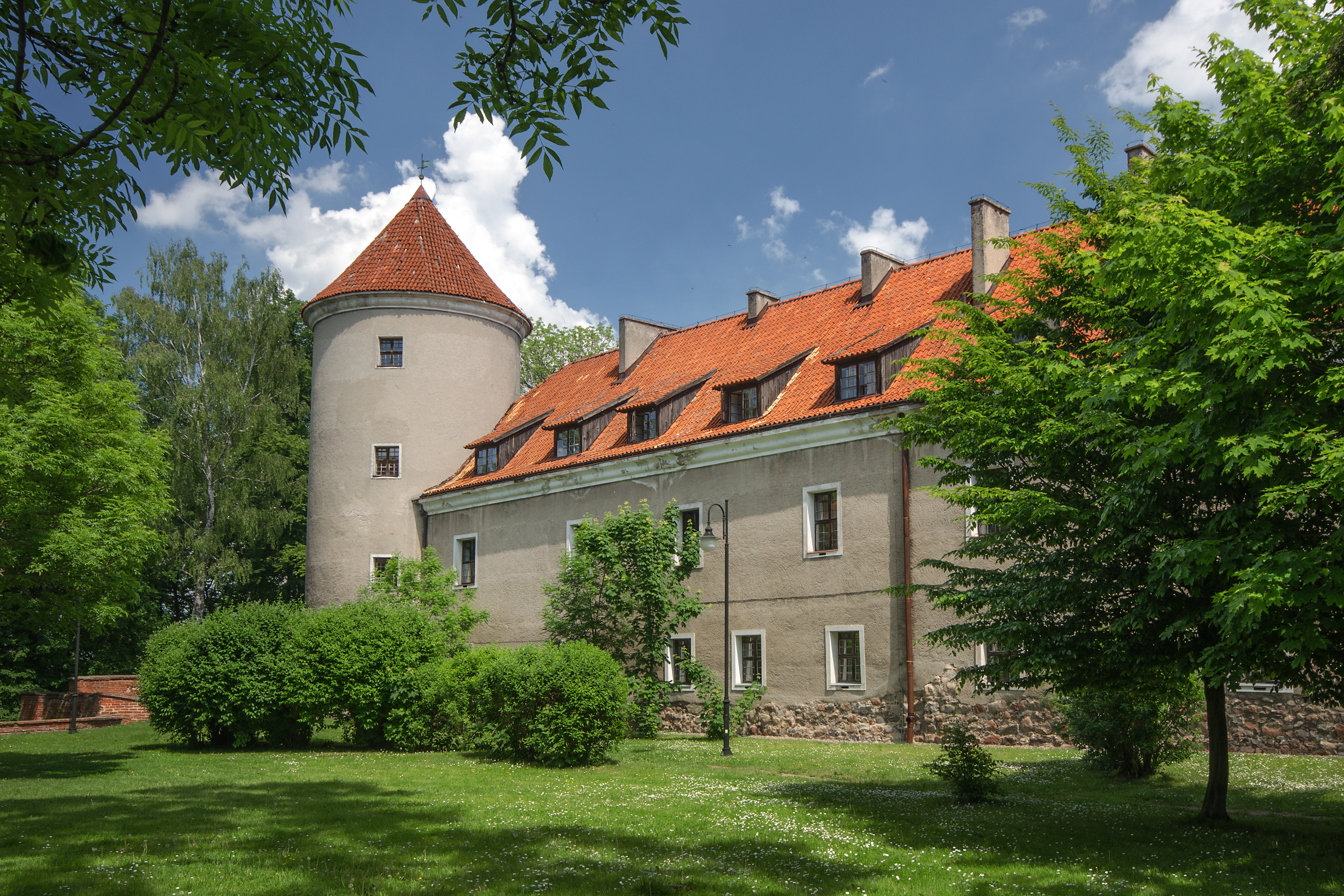
Pasłęk Castle

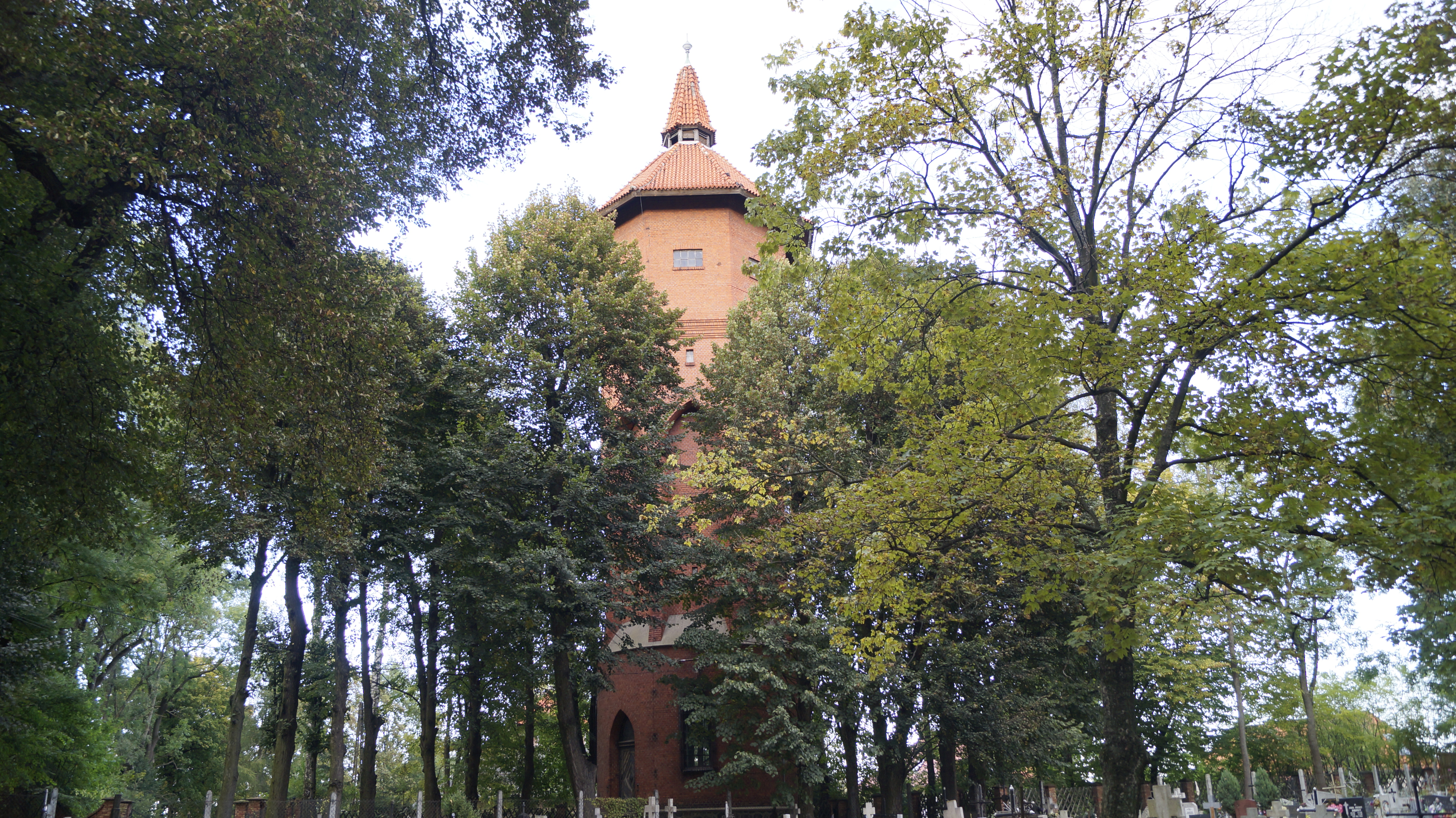
Water tower

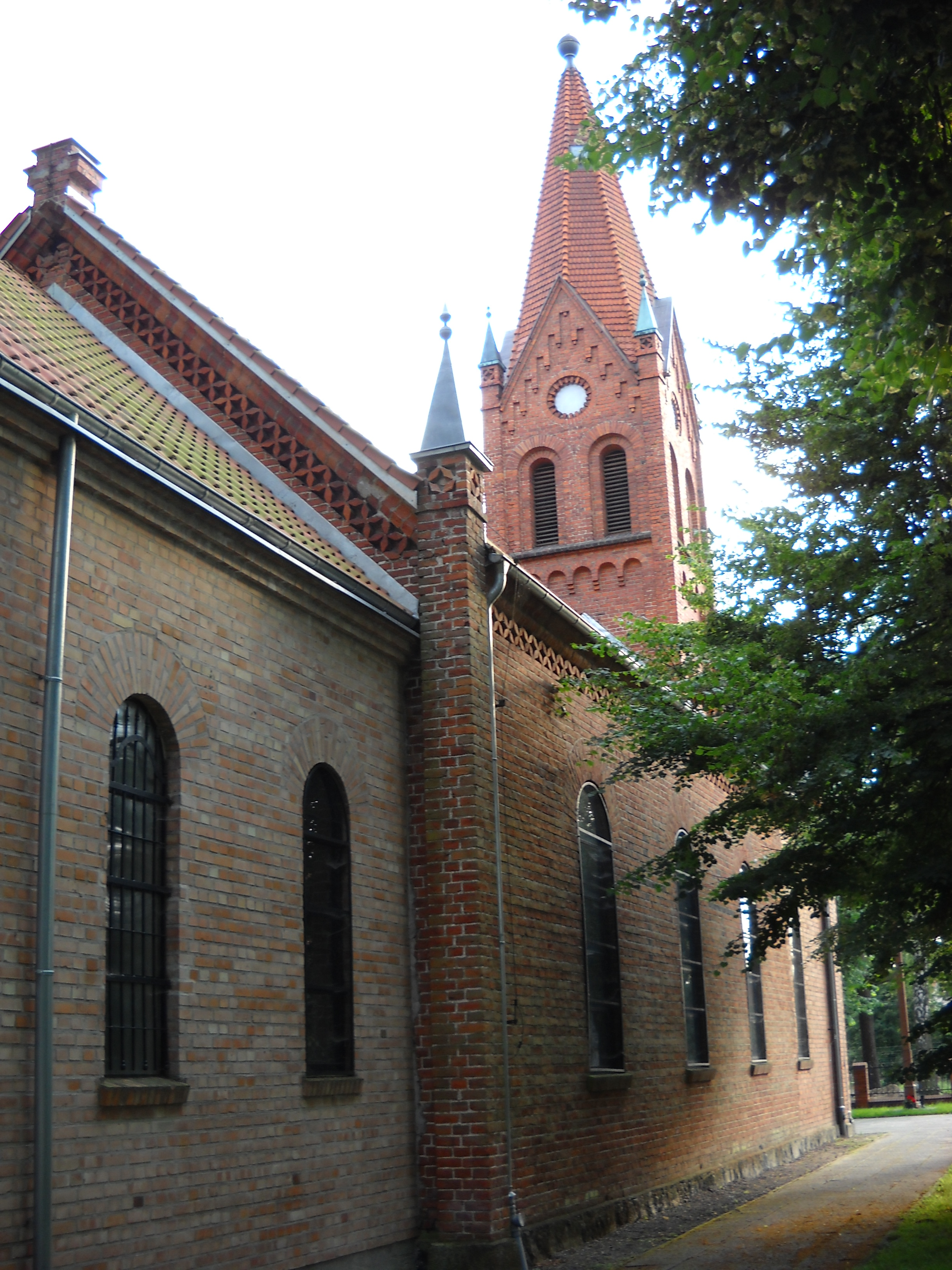
Church of the Nativity of Mary

== Transport ==
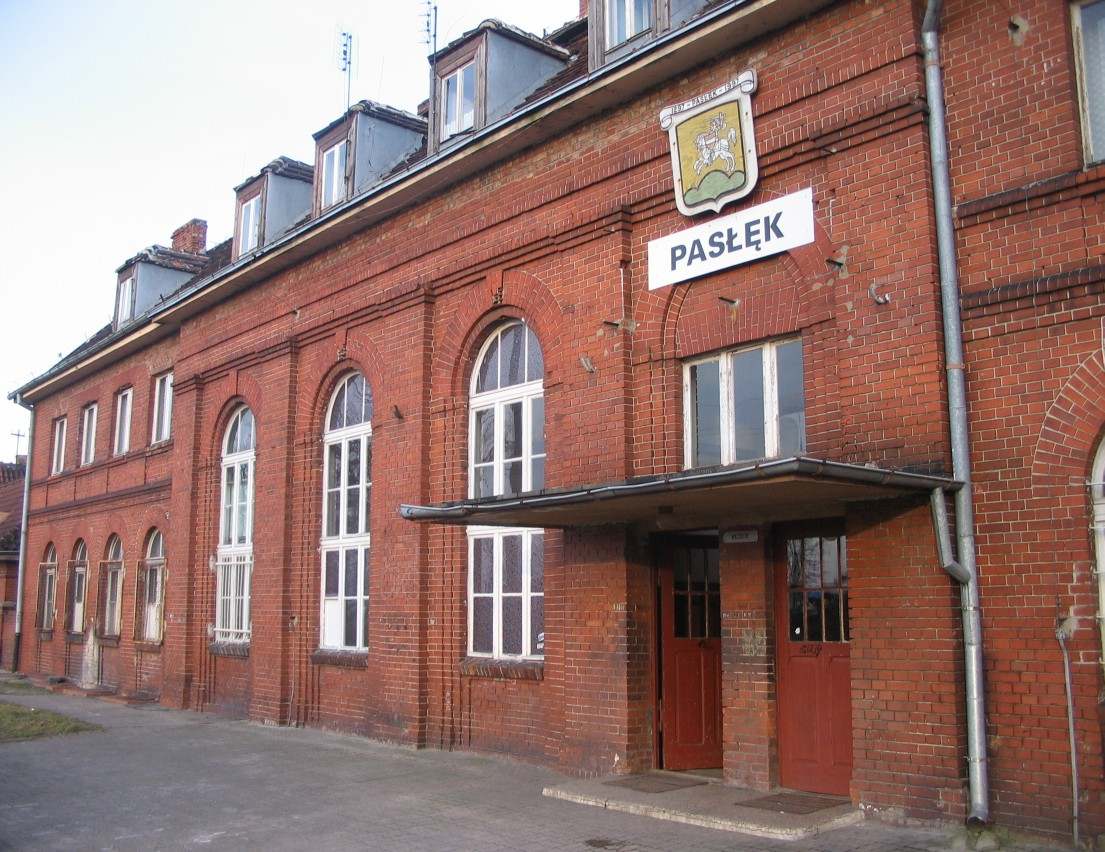
Train station

The Polish S7 expressway (highway), which is part of European route E77, bypasses the town to the west, connecting it with Gdańsk, Warsaw, Kraków and the border with Slovakia at Chyżne. Also the Voivodeship roads (roads of regional importance) 505, 513, 526 and 527 run through the town.

Also, a railway station is located in Pasłęk.

== Sports ==
The town's main sports club is Polonia Pasłęk with football, athletics and kickboxing sections.

== Twin towns ==
Pasłęk is twinned with:

- Itzehoe, Germany (since 1990)
- La Couronne, France (since 1994)

== Notable residents ==
- Joachim Friedrich Henckel (1712–1779), Prussian surgeon
- Victor Valois (1841-1924), German naval officer, Vice Admiral
- Hugo Erdmann (1862–1910), German chemist
- Max Liedtke (1894–1955), German journalist and Righteous Among the Nations
- Lotte Laserstein (1898–1993), German-Swedish painter and portraitist
- Dietmar Damerau (1935–2011), German artist
- Hans Grodotzki (1936–2026), East German long-distance runner
- Bolesław Szymański (born 1950), Polish computer scientist
- Katarzyna Ankudowicz (born 1981), Polish actress
