= Theodorus Dekker =

Dutch mathematician (1927–2021)

- Born: Theodorus Jozef Dekker; 1 March 1927; Heerhugowaard, Netherlands
- Died: November 25, 2021 (aged 94)
- Education: University of Amsterdam (PhD)
- Known for: Dekker's algorithm
- Scientific career
- Fields: Math
- Workplaces: University of Amsterdam
- Thesis: Paradoxical Decompositions of Sets and Spaces
- Doctoral advisor: Johannes de Groot

Theodorus Jozef Dekker (Dirk Dekker, 1 March 1927 - 25 November 2021) was a Dutch mathematician.

Dekker completed his Ph.D. degree from the University of Amsterdam in 1958. His thesis was titled "Paradoxical Decompositions of Sets and Spaces".

Dekker invented an algorithm that allows two processes to share a single-use resource without conflict, using only shared memory for communication, named Dekker's algorithm.
