= Computer Applications (UIL) =

Computer Applications is one of several academic events sanctioned by the University Interscholastic League Computer Applications is designed to test students' abilities to use word processing, spreadsheet, and database applications software, including integration of applications. It is not the same as the Computer Science contest, which tests programming abilities. It is not just a contest, it is also a subject in the ICSE curricullum.

Computer Applications began during the 1994-95 scholastic year, replacing the Keyboarding contest previously held by UIL. The contest is set to end in the 2023-24 school year, with no announced replacement.

== Eligibility ==
Students in Grade 9 through Grade 12 are eligible to enter the event.

Each school may send up to three students.

Computer Applications is an individual contest only. There is no team competition in this event.

== Rules and Scoring ==
The test consists of two parts.

The first part is a five-minute tie-breaker question, which as its name suggests is only used in the event of a tie on the main test. No intermediate time signal is given during the tie-breaker; at the end of the five minutes the students must immediately stop typing, at which point they are instructed to print out their answer.

The second part is the main test. It consists of two questions, which must be completed in 30 minutes. A three-minute preview period is allotted before the test begins. Intermediate time signals are given when 10 minutes and two minutes remain. At the end of 30 minutes the students must immediately stop processing; if they have initiated the print command prior to the end of the test they are allowed to finish printing.

The time periods stated above do not include time for setting up and removing computer equipment.

Any commercially available laptop or notebook computer can be used during the contest, along with printer, external keyboard/keypad, and mouse. However, only the Microsoft Office applications software package can be used.

Scoring will vary from test to test; the answer key for the questions will be accompanied by a score sheet indicating the value of each item to be scored.

== Determining the Winner ==
The top three individuals will advance to the next round.

The tiebreaker is the score of the five-minute tiebreaker question. In the event a tie remains, all remaining individuals will advance.

For district meet academic championship and district meet sweepstakes awards, points are awarded to the school as follows:

- Individual places: 1st—15, 2nd—12, 3rd—10, 4th—8, 5th—6, and 6th—4.
- There is no cap on the number of points a school can earn in Computer Applications.

== List of prior winners ==
NOTE: For privacy reasons, only the winning school is shown.

NOTE: UIL reclassification happened in 2015, adding the 6A classification.

NOTE: Due to the COVID-19 Pandemic, the 2020 state contest was cancelled.

School Year	Class A	Class AA	Class AAA	Class AAAA	Class AAAAA	Class AAAAAA
1995	Menard	Van Alstyne	Cameron Yoe	Wichita Falls	Weslaco	N/A
1996	Era	Coahoma	Colorado City	Livingston	Duncanville	N/A
1997	Sulphur Bluff	Marion	Colorado City	Snyder	Duncanville	N/A
1998	Westbrook	Edgewood	Perryton	San Angelo Lake View	Flower Mound Marcus	N/A
1999	Graford	Lindsay	Hamshire-Fannett	Brownwood	Weslaco	N/A
2000	Garden City	Keene	Giddings	Friendswood	College Station A&M Consolidated	N/A
2001	Granger	Edgewood	Midland Greenwood	Friendswood	College Station A&M Consolidated	N/A
2002	Lazbuddie	Edgewood	Giddings	Friendswood	Pasadena Dobie	N/A
2003	Rocksprings	Rosebud-Lott	Pearsall	Harlingen South	San Antonio Clark	N/A
2004	Lazbuddie	Wall	Hamshire-Fannett	Friendswood	Klein	N/A
2005	Loop	Mount Pleasant Chapel Hill	Llano	Sherman	College Station A&M Consolidated	N/A
2006	Wellington	Centerville	Hamshire-Fannett	Brownwood	Abilene Cooper	N/A
2007	Springlake-Earth	Crawford	Princeton	Friendswood	College Station A&M Consolidated	N/A
2008	Springlake-Earth	Grandview	Hamshire-Fannett	Sherman	Mission Sharyland	N/A
2009	Garden City	Shelbyville	Lubbock-Cooper	Friendswood	Humble Kingwood	N/A
2010	Junction	Sonora	Orangefield	Friendswood	Cypress Woods	N/A
2011	Yantis	Junction	Orangefield	Friendswood	Cypress Woods	N/A
2012	Chireno	Mount Pleasant Chapel Hill	Hamshire-Fannet	Roma	Clear Lake	N/A
2013	Chireno	Wall	Hamshire-Fannet	Livingston	Klein	N/A
2014	Chireno	Sunnyvale	Needville	Livingston	Cypress Woods	N/A
2015	Slidell	Goldthwaite	Mount Pleasant Chapel Hill	Argyle	Livingston	North Shore
2016	Sterling City	Sabine Pass	Blanco	Aubrey	Livingston	North Shore
2017	Happy	Goldthwaite	Mount Pleasant Chapel Hill	Liberty Hill	Lindale	North Shore
2018	Slidell	Winters	Mount Pleasant Chapel Hill	Melissa	Hallsville	North Shore
2019	Springlake-Earth	Vega	Mount Pleasant Chapel Hill	Melissa	Waller	Cypress Woods
2021	Happy	Sanford-Fritch	Elysian Fields	Andrews	Friendswood	Flower Mound
2022	Happy	Vega	Mount Pleasant Chapel Hill	Melissa	Sharyland Pioneer	Cypress Woods
2023	Rocksprings	Winters	Fairfield	Lindale	Melissa	Flower Mound
