= Computer Science (UIL) =

American academic event sanctioned by the University Interscholastic League

Computer science is one of several academic events sanctioned by the University Interscholastic League (UIL).

Computer science is designed to test students' programming abilities. It is not the same as the Computer Applications contest, which tests students' abilities to use word processing, spreadsheet, and database applications software, including integration of applications.

Computer science began during the 1990-91 scholastic year as strictly a team event. It was not scored as an individual event until the 1996-97 school year.

== Eligibility ==
Students in Grade 9 through Grade 12 are eligible to enter this event.

Each school may send up to four students. However, in districts with eight or more schools the number of students per school may be limited to three. In order for the school to compete in the team competition the school must send three students.

== Rules and Scoring ==
The contest consists of two parts, a written test and a programming exercise.

On the written test, 45 minutes are allotted. Time warnings are not required but can be given. A timer should be present at the competition, which can be easily seen by all contestants. At the end of the 45 minutes the student may finish completing an answer. Six points are given for each correct answer; two points are deducted for each incorrect answer. Skipped or unanswered questions are not scored.

On the programming test, two hours are allotted. The solution is graded as correct or incorrect with points assigned for each problem. However, incorrect solutions may be reworked by the team. Any commercially available computer may be used in the competition. The programming language to be used is limited to Java and the compiler used for the contest will be the Oracle Java Development Kit; specific acceptable versions are determined by the UIL prior to each school year.

== Determining the Winner ==
The top three individuals and the top team will advance to the next round. In addition, within each region, the highest-scoring second place team from all district competitions advances as the "wild card" to regional competition, and within the state, the highest-scoring second place team from all regional competitions advances as the wild card to the state competition. Members of advancing teams who did not place individually remain eligible to compete for individual awards at higher levels.

For individual competition (overall and for each subsection), the tiebreaker is percent accuracy (number of problems answered correctly divided by number of problems attempted, defined as any question with a mark or erasure in the answer blank). In the event a tie remains, all remaining individuals will advance.

For the team competition the first tiebreaker is the programming score, then the written exam score (using the total score tiebreaker system used at the district level). If a tie still exists, all remaining tied teams will advance or place.

For district meet academic championship and district meet sweepstakes awards, points are awarded to the school as follows:

- Individual places: 1st—15, 2nd—12, 3rd—10, 4th—8, 5th—6, and 6th—4.
- Team places (district): 1st—10 and 2nd—5.
- Team places (regional and state): 1st—20, 2nd—16, and 3rd—12.
- The maximum number of points a school may earn in Computer Science is 37 at the district level and 42 at the regional and state levels.

== List of prior winners ==
=== Individual ===
NOTE: For privacy reasons, only the winning school is shown. Computer Science was strictly a team event until the 1996-97 school year.

School Year	Class A	Class AA	Class AAA	Class AAAA	Class AAAAA	Class AAAAAA
1996-97	Jayton	Navarro	Clyde	Sulphur Springs	(tie) Cypress Falls/Katy Taylor	
1997-98	Rule	(tie) Hamilton/Hawkins/Stockdale	Jefferson	Bridge City	Fort Worth Dunbar	
1998-99	Muenster	De Leon	Taylor	Fort Worth Dunbar	Garland	
1999-2000	(tie) Muenster/Henrietta Midway	Seymour	Sour Lake Hardin-Jefferson	Lake Travis	Marcus	
2000-01	Muenster	Ozona	Monahans	Lake Travis	Science and Engineering Magnet	
2001-02	Muenster	Seymour	Sour Lake Hardin-Jefferson	Pine Tree	Flower Mound	
2002-03	Nueces Canyon	Seymour	Sour Lake Hardin-Jefferson	(tie) Denton Ryan/Fort Worth Dunbar	Plano East	
2003-04	Nueces Canyon	Navarro	Lindale	Lake Travis	Talented and Gifted Magnet (TAG)	
2004-05	Nueces Canyon	Salado	Needville	(tie) Waller/Lake Travis	Tomball	
2005-06	Savoy	Refugio	Center	Friendswood	Round Rock Westwood	
2006-07	Garden City	Ozona	Gonzales	Midlothian	Katy Taylor	
2007-08	Martin's Mill	Wall	Gonzales	Katy Seven Lakes	(Tie) Arlington Martin, Katy Cinco Ranch, Clements	
2008-09	Port Aransas	Wall	Gonzales	Denton	Klein	
2009-10	Harmony School of Excellence (Houston)	Irving	Somerset	(Tie) Aledo, Friendswood, Rockport-Fulton (two individuals)	(Tie) Katy Cinco Ranch, Fort Worth Paschal, Southlake Carroll, Cypress Woods, Austin Westwood (two individuals), Fort Bend Clements, Richmond Travis, San Antonio Jay	
2010-11	Port Aransas	Buna	Needville	Friendswood	(Tie)Fort Bend Clements/Cypress Woods	
2011-12	Sudan	Wall	Boerne	Pearland Dawson	Cypress Woods	
2012-13	Sudan	Wall	Andrews	Austin LBJ	Fort Worth Paschal	
2013-14	Sudan	Jim Ned HS Tuscola	Needville	Austin LBJ	Clements HS (Sugar Land)	
2014-15	Bynum	Booker	Blanco	(Tie) Kennedale/Needville	Heritage (Frisco)	Plano West Sr High
2015-16	Slidell	Brackett	Blanco	La Grange	Heritage (Frisco)	(Tie) Klein HS / Clements HS (Sugar Land)
2016-17	Borden	Ozona	Blanco	Boerne	Lovejoy (Lucas)	(Tie) Plano West / Cypress Woods / Edinburgh North
2017-18	Borden	Ozona	Chapel Hill	Boerne	Austin LBJ	(Tie) Cypress Woods / Richardson
2018-19	Borden	Ozona	Ponder	Giddings	Austin LBJ	Cypress Woods
2020-21	Aspermont	San Augustine	Fairfield	School for Talented & Gifted (Dallas)	Lovejoy (Lucas)	Cypress Woods
2021-22	Aspermont	San Augustine	Fairfield	School for Talented & Gifted (Dallas)	Heritage (Frisco)	Cypress Woods
2022-23	Aspermont	San Augustine	Brock	School for Talented & Gifted (Dallas)	Frisco Lebanon Trail	Fort Bend Clements
2023-24	Aspermont	Ozona	(Tie) FW Harmony Innovation / Fairfield / Universal City Randolph	(Tie) School for Science and Engineering (Dallas) / School for Talented & Gifted (Dallas)	(Tie) Joshua / Frisco Lebanon Trail / Lucas Lovejoy / CC Flour Bluff	(Tie) Plano West / Allen / Conroe Grand Oaks / Katy Seven Lakes / Round Rock McNeil
2024-25	Rankin	Olney	Wall	Dallas School for Science and Engineering	CC Flour Bluff	Round Rock Westwood
2025-26	Aspermont	Sudan	Shallowater	Jonathan Kasmir	Argyle	Cypress Woods

=== Team ===
NOTE: The 1990-91 contest was limited to Class AAAA and Class AAAAA only; other classifications were not added until the 1991-92 year. The AAAAAA classification was not added until the 2014-2015 year.

School Year	Class A	Class AA	Class AAA	Class AAAA	Class AAAAA	Class AAAAAA
1990-91	(none)	(none)	(none)	Sweetwater	Houston Bellaire	
1991-92	Brookeland	Lockney	La Vernia	Austin Westlake	Langham Creek	
1992-93	Lazbuddie	Lockney	Lake Travis	Fort Stockton	Langham Creek	
1993-94	Lazbuddie	Blanco	Queen City	Bridge City	Fort Worth Dunbar	
1994-95	Lazbuddie	Blanco	Lake Travis	Austin LBJ	Fort Worth Dunbar	
1995-96	Rule	Stinnett West Texas	Teague	Stephenville	Fort Worth Dunbar	
1996-97	Lazbuddie	Navarro	Clyde	Whitehouse	Cypress Falls	
1997-98	Rule	Stinnett West Texas	Coldspring Jones	Sulphur Springs	Round Rock	
1998-99	Muenster	Stockdale	Devine	Fort Worth Dunbar	Langham Creek	
1999-2000	Muenster	Seymour	Stafford	Cedar Hill	Dallas School of Science and Engineering	
2000-01	Muenster	Ozona	Monahans	Southlake Carroll	Dallas School of Science and Engineering	
2001-02	Muenster	Seymour	Center	Southlake Carroll	Katy Taylor	
2002-03	Perrin-Whitt	Ozona	Lindale	Austin LBJ	Southlake Carroll	
2003-04	Ivanhoe Sam Rayburn	Ozona	Lindale	Waller	Katy Taylor	
2004-05	Plains	Mount Pleasant Chapel Hill	Gonzales	Waller	Katy Taylor	
2005-06	Savoy	Ozona	Center	Friendswood	Cypress Falls	
2006-07	Garden City	Ozona	Gonzales	Midlothian	Katy Taylor	
2007-08	Garden City	Wall	Gonzales	Katy Seven Lakes	Fort Bend Clements	
2008-09	Port Aransas	Wall	Lucas Lovejoy	Friendswood	Fort Bend Clements	
2009-10	Harmony School of Excellence (Houston)	Wall	Wimberley	Friendswood	Fort Bend Clements	
2010-11	Port Aransas	Wall	Needville	Friendswood	Fort Bend Clements	
2011-12	Port Aransas	Wall	Boerne	Austin LBJ	Katy Seven Lakes	
2012-13	Booker	Wall	Needville	Austin LBJ	Cypress Woods	
2013-14	Harmony School of Innovation (Fort Worth)	Mount Vernon	Needville	Austin LBJ	Clements HS (Sugar Land)	
2014-15	Slidell	Booker	Blanco	Needville	Austin LBJ	Clements HS (Sugar Land)
2015-16	Slidell	Brackett	Harmony School of Innovation (Fort Worth)	Needville	Heritage (Frisco)	Clements HS (Sugar Land)
2016-17	Whiteface	Ozona	Blanco	Little Cypress-Mauriceville HS (Orange)	Johnson (LBJ) HS	Cypress Woods
2017-18	Borden	Ozona	Chapel Hill	Wylie (Abilene)	Johnson (LBJ) HS	Clements HS (Sugar Land)
2018-19	Borden	Ozona	Wall	Little Cypress-Mauriceville	Johnson (LBJ) HS	Richardson
2020-21	Slidell	San Augustine	Fairfield	School for Talented & Gifted (Dallas)	Lovejoy (Lucas)	Cypress Woods
2021-22	Aspermont	San Augustine	Fairfield	School for Talented & Gifted (Dallas)	Heritage (Frisco)	Clements HS (Sugar Land)
2022-23	Aspermont	San Augustine	Harmony School of Innovation (Fort Worth)	Needville	Frisco Lebanon Trail	Allen
2023-24	Aspermont	San Augustine	Harmony School of Innovation (Fort Worth)	Science and Engineering Magnet (Dallas)	Lebanon Trail (Frisco)	Katy Seven Lakes
2024-25	Lenorah Grady	Olney	Wall	Dallas School for Science and Engineering	College Station A&M Consolidated	Katy Seven Lakes
2025-26	Knippa	Haskell	Hill Country College Prep	Needville	Dallas School of Science and Engineering	Cypress Woods
