= Computer Science (journal) =

- Discipline: Theoretical and applied computer science
- Language: English
- Edited by: Jacek Kitowski

Publication details
- History: 1999–present
- Publisher: AGH University of Science and Technology Press (Poland)
- Frequency: Quarterly
- Open access: Yes

Standard abbreviations
- ISO 4: Comput. Sci.

Indexing
- ISSN: 1508-2806

Links
- Journal homepage; Online archive

Computer Science is a peer-reviewed scientific journal published by the AGH University of Science and Technology (Kraków Poland) and edited by faculty members of the Departments of Computer Science and Automatics. The journal was established in 1999 and since beginning of 2012 is published quarterly. The editor-in-chief is Jacek Kitowski.

== Scope ==
The journal publishes articles covering all aspects of theoretical and applied computer science problems.

== Special issues ==
Occasionally the journal will publish special issues containing articles based on presentations at selected conferences.

== Scoring by the Polish Ministry of Science and Higher Education ==
Scoring assigned by the Polish Ministry of Science and Higher Education, as one of important factors used to evaluate research facilities in Poland, had following values for Computer Science journal:

- 7.0 (from 2012)
- 6.0 (2011)
- 2.0 (2010 and before)
