= Dell Inspiron laptops =

Laptop computer series by Dell

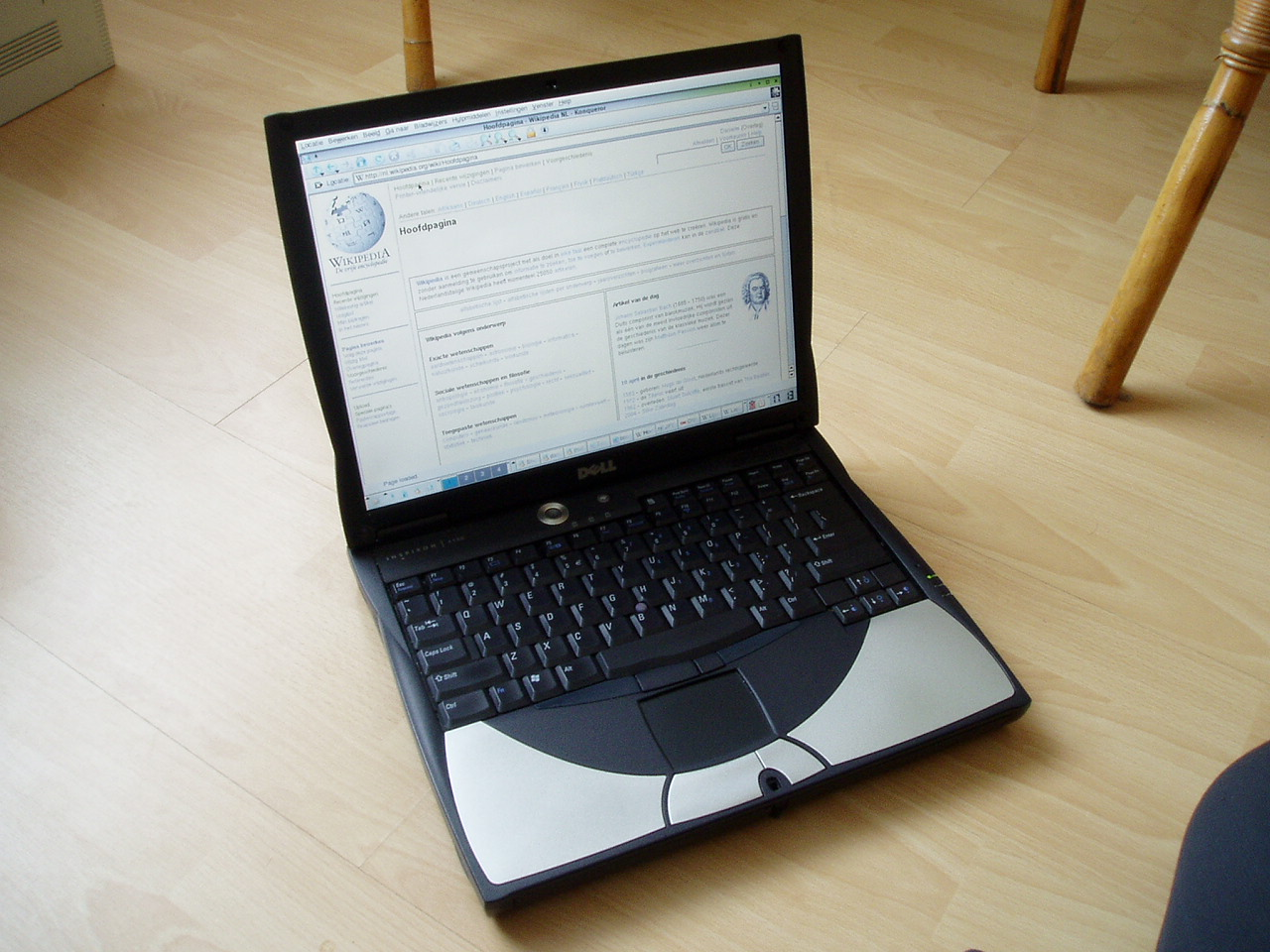
- Developer: Dell
- Manufacturer: Dell
- Product family: Inspiron
- Released: 1997
- Discontinued: 2025
- Operating system: Windows
- CPU: Intel, AMD, ARM, Qualcomm
- Graphics: Intel/AMD/Qualcomm (integrated); ATI/AMD/Nvidia/Intel (discrete)
- Marketing target: Consumer
- Successor: Dell
- Related: Vostro, Latitude, XPS
- Website: Dell Inspiron

Dell Inspiron laptops are a discontinued consumer-oriented line of laptop computers made by American company Dell under the Dell Inspiron branding. The first Inspiron laptop model was introduced before 1999.

== Early models ==
The early Dell Inspiron models listed below went through a number of changes from 1997 to 2006, so the specifications on each model may be incomplete or incorrect. There are also some earlier models than these, but those have not been added to the list yet. The Inspiron 1545, and 1546 are not in this list.

=== Inspiron 3000 (1997) ===
The very first Inspiron laptop was the Inspiron 3000, released in 1997. It came in three specific models, the M166ST, M200ST, and M233XT, spanning three different processor clock speeds and two screen sizes. The first model to be released was the 266 MHz M233XT, which was then followed by the two lower end models, the M166ST clocked at 166 MHz, with 16MB of SDRAM, a 2.1GB hard drive, and a 12.1" screen, and the M200ST clocked at 200 MHz, with 32MB of RAM, and presumably also a 12.1" screen (if the 'S' in the model number corresponds to SVGA).

- Processor: Intel Pentium MMX, running at 166, 200, or 233 MHz
- Chipset: Intel 430TX
- Cache memory: The M166ST had 32 KiB of internal CPU cache memory and 256 KiB of external L2 cache memory (pipeline-burst SRAM). The M200ST, and M233XT differed by having 512 KiB of L2 cache.
- Memory: 16 MiB of soldered-on system RAM, with support for expansion up to 144 MiB
- Graphics: NeoMagic 2160 graphics controller, with 2 MiB of video memory
- Screen: 12.1" SVGA (800x600) 16M-color, or 13.3" XGA (1024x768) 64K-color, Active Matrix LCD
- Battery: 39 Wh Lithium-Ion
- Modules: Modular option drive bay supporting either a CD-ROM drive or a second battery
- Mic/speakers: "Built-in microphone and stereo speakers", along with "jacks for connecting external speakers, head-phones, or a microphone".

=== Inspiron 2100 (1998) ===
Released in 1998, the Dell Inspiron 2100 was a lightweight laptop that Dell branded as "Ultra-Thin & Light" and "Ultra Mobile", weighing 22lbs (10kg). Its starting price was $1,699. A near-identical cousin of the 2100 was the Dell Latitude L400.

- Processor: Intel Pentium III @700 MHz
- Memory: 128 or 256 MB of DDR SDRAM
- Graphics: ATI Rage Mobility M (with 4 MB of video memory)
- Display: 12.1" 1024x768
- Storage: 10 or 20 GB Ultra ATA hard drive

=== Inspiron 3500 (1998) ===
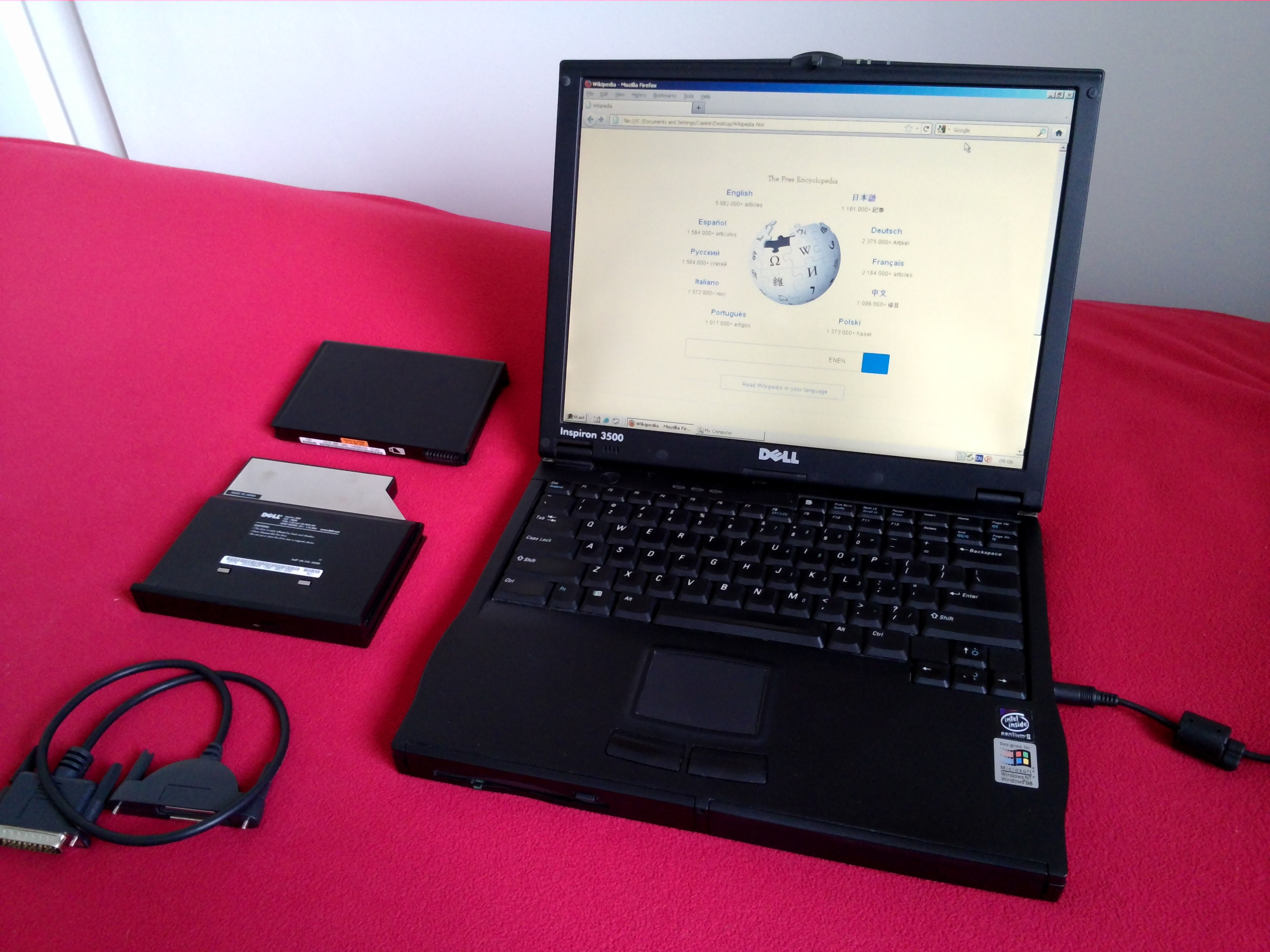
Inspiron 3500 with accessories

Released in November 1998, the Dell Inspiron 3500 is a lightweight laptop manufactured by original design manufacturer (ODM) Compal for Dell, based on the Compal TS30T. It was marketed to have great value and to be "The Inspiron Experience."

- Processor: Intel Pentium II @ 300, 333, or 366 MHz, Intel Celeron @ 300 MHz
- Memory: Up to 256MB of RAM
- Graphics: NeoMagic MagicMedia 256AV (with 2.5 MB of video memory)
- Display: 13.3" or 14.1" Active Matrix LCD at 1024x768
- Storage: 4.3GB, 6.4GB, or 10GB Ultra ATA hard drive

=== Inspiron 7500 (1999) ===
Released in 1999, the Dell Inspiron 7500 was a speedy laptop that Dell branded as "A Mobile Desktop". Its starting price was $4,101.

- Processor: Intel Pentium III @ 750, 700, 650, 600, 500 or 450 MHz, Intel Celeron @ 433, 450, 466, or 500 MHz
- Memory: 32, 64, 128, 192, 256 or 512 MB of PC100 RAM
- Graphics: ATI Rage Mobility M (with 4 or 8 MB of video memory)
- Display: 15" 1024x768, optional 1400x1050, 15.4" 1280x1024
- Storage: 4.8, 6, 10, 20 or 30 GB Ultra ATA hard drive

=== Inspiron 3800 (2000) ===
Released in 2000, the Dell Inspiron 3800 was an affordable laptop that Dell branded as "Stylish and Affordable". Its starting price was $1,199. A cousin of the 3800 was the Dell Latitude CPx J650GT.

- Processor: Intel Pentium III @700 or 600 MHz, Intel Celeron @600 or 700 MHz
- Memory: 32, 64, 96, 128, 192, 256, 384 or 512 MB of DDR RAM
- Graphics: ATI Rage Mobility (with 8 MB of video memory, 2x AGP)
- Display: 12.1" 800x600, or a 14.1" 1024x768
- Storage: 5, 6, 10, or 20 GB Ultra ATA hard drive

=== Inspiron 4000 (2000) ===
Released in 2000, the Dell Inspiron 4000 was a lightweight laptop that Dell branded as "Ultra-Thin & Light" and "Light as a feather, strong as an ox". Its starting price was $1,499. Equivalent models of the 4000 were the Dell Latitude C500, C510, and C600.

- Processor: Intel Pentium III @650, 700, 800 or 850 MHz, or an Intel Celeron @600 MHz
- Memory: 64, 128, 192, 256, 384 or 512 MB of DDR RAM
- Graphics: ATI RAGE Mobility 128 3D (with 8 MB of video RAM, 2x AGP)
- Display: 14.1" 1024x768, optional 1400x1050
- Storage: 5, 10, or 20 GB Ultra ATA hard drive

=== Inspiron 8000 (2000) ===
Released in 2000, the Dell Inspiron 8000 was a mobile workstation that Dell branded as a mobile desktop. Its starting price was $1,649. A related model of the 8000 was the Dell Latitude C800.

- Processor: Intel Pentium III @650, 700, 800, 833, 850, 900, 1000, 1113, or 1200 MHz.
- Memory: 64, 128, 192, 256, 384 or 512 MB of DDR RAM
- Graphics: ATI Mobility — M4 (with 8, 16 or 32 MB of video memory) or RADEON 7500 (with 64 MB of video memory), or NVIDIA GeForce2 Go (with 16 or 32 MB of video memory)
- Display: 14.1” 1400x1050, a 15” 1400x1050, optional 1600x1200.
- Storage: 5, 10, 20, 30, 32, 40, or 60 GB Ultra ATA hard drive

=== Inspiron 2600/2650 (2002) ===
Released: 2002

The Inspiron 2600 and 2650 were clones of the Latitude V710 and V740 respectively, using nearly identical hardware.

- Processor: Mobile Celeron @ 1.06 or 1.3 GHz or Pentium 4 M @ 1.6, 1.7, or 1.9 GHz
- Memory: 128, 192, 256, 384, or 512 MB @ 266 MHz (up to 512 MB)
- Graphics: Intel 3D AGP (32 MB Shared Memory), nVidia GeForce2 Go 100 16 MB or 32 MB
- Storage: 20, 30, or 40 GB HDD
- Display: 14.1 inch display, 15 inch display, or 15 inch SXGA+ display.

=== Inspiron 8500/8600 (2003) ===
Released: 2003

The Inspiron 8500 and 8600 were mainstream notebooks that were clones of the Latitude D800 and D810, using nearly identical hardware. The Inspiron 8500 was the only model that utilized an Intel Pentium 4-M processor, while the Inspiron 8600 was based on Intel's Centrino platform and utilized an Intel Pentium M processor. Its contemporary Latitude D800/D810 models they were based on utilized Intel Pentium M processors like the Inspiron 8600. Since they were clones of the D800/D810, they included many Latitude-specific features such as the Dell D-Dock and the D-bay (which allowed users to swap out the CD drive for a floppy drive or secondary battery). They were also one of the first Dell laptops to use a widescreen display, alongside the Latitude D800/D810. Like the Inspiron 1100/5100 series that was also released in 2003, the 8500 and 8600 were among the first Dell laptops to be offered in Venice Blue and Moonlight Silver. Additionally, snap-on faux-wood lid covers were an available accessory which allowed customers to customize the look of their Inspiron.

- Processor:
  - Inspiron 8500: Intel Pentium 4-M Northwood @ 2 GHz or 2.4 GHz.
  - Inspiron 8600: Intel Pentium M/Centrino Banias/Dothan @ 1.3 GHz, 1.4 GHz, or 1.7 GHz.
- Memory: 128 MB @ 333 MHz (up to 2 GB).
- Chipset: Intel 855PM.
- Graphics:
  - Inspiron 8500: ATi Mobility Radeon 9000 32 MB, nVidia GeForce 4 4200 Go 64 MB.
  - Inspiron 8600: nVidia GeForce 4 4200 Go 64 MB, ATi Mobility Radeon 9600 128 MB, nVidia GeForce FX Go5650 128 MB.
- Storage: 30, 40, 60, or 80 GB HDD.
- Display: 15.4 inch display in 1680x1050 or 1920x1200 w/WUXGA.

=== Inspiron 2200 (2005) ===
Released in 2005, the Inspiron 2200 is the successor to the Inspiron 1000. It was branded as "Notebook Essentials" and started at $799.

- Processor: Intel Celeron or Pentium M
- Memory: 256 MB or 512 MB of DDR RAM, upgradable to 2 GB
- Graphics: Intel Extreme 2 Graphics
- Display: 14" or 15" XGA display
- Storage: 30, 40, or 60 GB Ultra ATA hard drive
- Battery: 65 Wh Lithium-ion, 8-cell

=== Inspiron 1300/B130/B120 (2005) ===
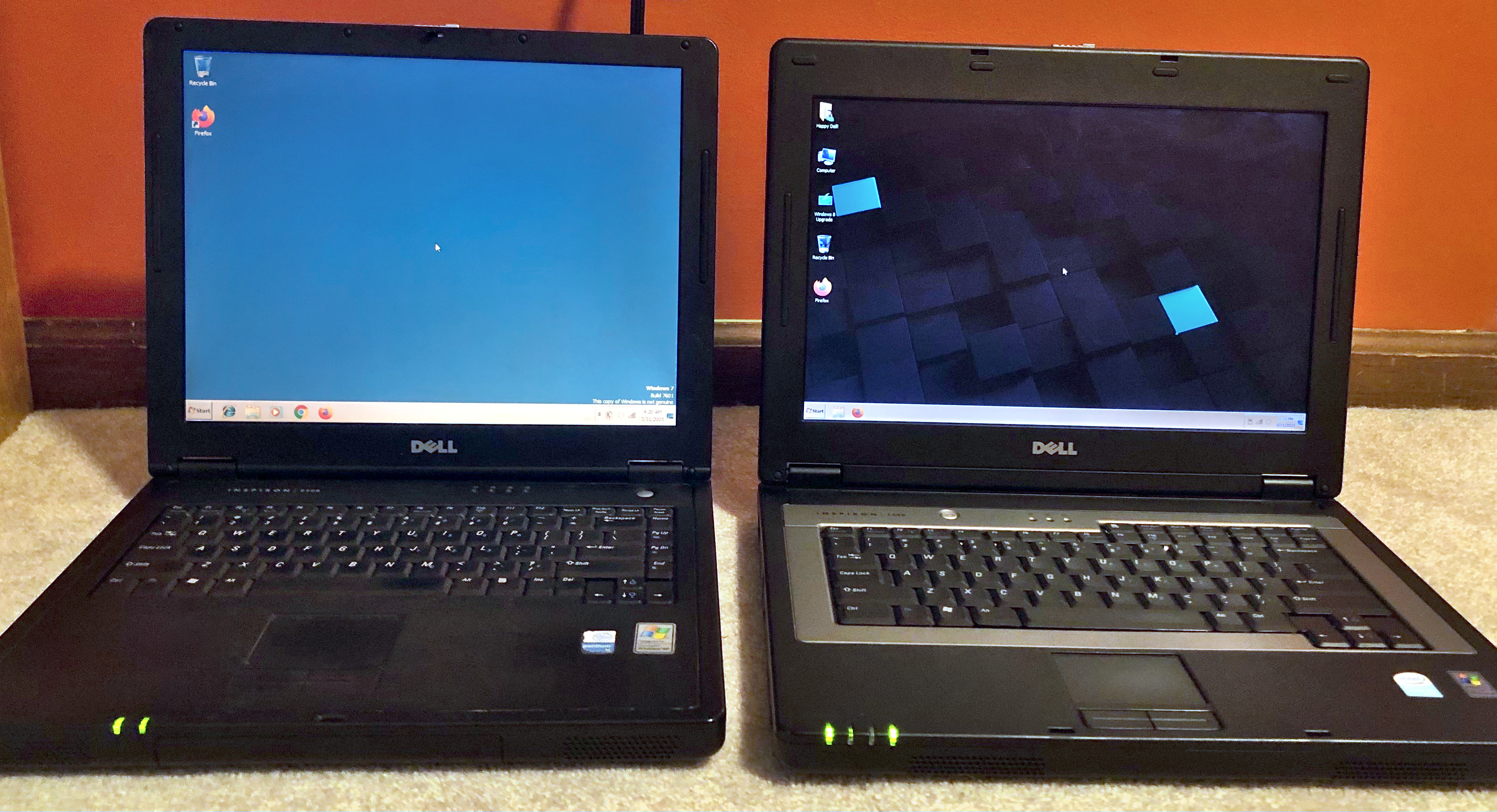
Dell Inspiron 1300 (right) next to an Inspiron 2200, both running Windows 7

Released in late 2005, the Inspiron 1300/B130/B120 is the successor to the Inspiron 2200. The Inspiron B120 is 14-inch, B130 is 15-inch. The Inspiron 1300 is available in both screen sizes. It cost $599 for the base model. The Inspiron 1300/B130/B120 is related to the Latitude 120L.

- Processor: Intel Celeron or Pentium M
- Memory: 256 MB, 512 MB, 1 GB of DDR2 PC2-4200 RAM, upgradable to 2 GB.
- Graphics: Intel GMA 900 with 128 MB of shared graphics memory.
- Display: 14" or 15.4" WXGA display
- Storage: 40 or 60 GB Ultra ATA hard drive
- Battery: 29 Wh Lihium-ion, 4-cell (Optional 6-cell available)

=== Inspiron E1405, aka Inspiron 640m (2006) ===
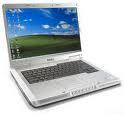
Dell Inspiron E1405 in silver

The Inspiron E1405 featured a 14.1" display in a 1.5 (H) x 13 (W) x 9.6 (D) inch 2.4 kg clamshell case. This model was also marketed under the name Dell Inspiron 640m.

- Processor: Intel Centrino — Core Duo T2050 or T2500, or Core 2 Duo T5500, T5600, T7200, T7400, T7600
- Memory: 1, 2, 3, or 4 GiB of shared dual channel DDR2 SDRAM @ 667 MHz
- Chipset: Intel 945GM Express
- Graphics Processor: Integrated Intel GMA 950
- LCD: 14.1" (16:10) 1280×800, optionally with TrueLife, or 1440×900 with TrueLife
- Storage: 80 or 100 GB SATA HDD at 5400 RPM
- Optical Drive: Tray-load, 8x dual-layer DVD+/-RW or 24x DVD/CD-RW
- Battery: 6-cell (56 Whr), or 9-cell (85 Whr), Lithium Ion
- Wi-Fi Card: Mini-card, Dell Wireless 1390 802.11g or 5100 802.11n
- Bluetooth: Optional Dell Wireless Bluetooth Internal 350
- I/O ports: 4x USB; 1x FireWire; 1x Fast Ethernet; 56K modem; 5-in-1 memory card reader; Express Card slot; VGA output; S-Video output; headphone jack; microphone jack/line-in; power adapter port

== Inspiron 1525 (2008) ==
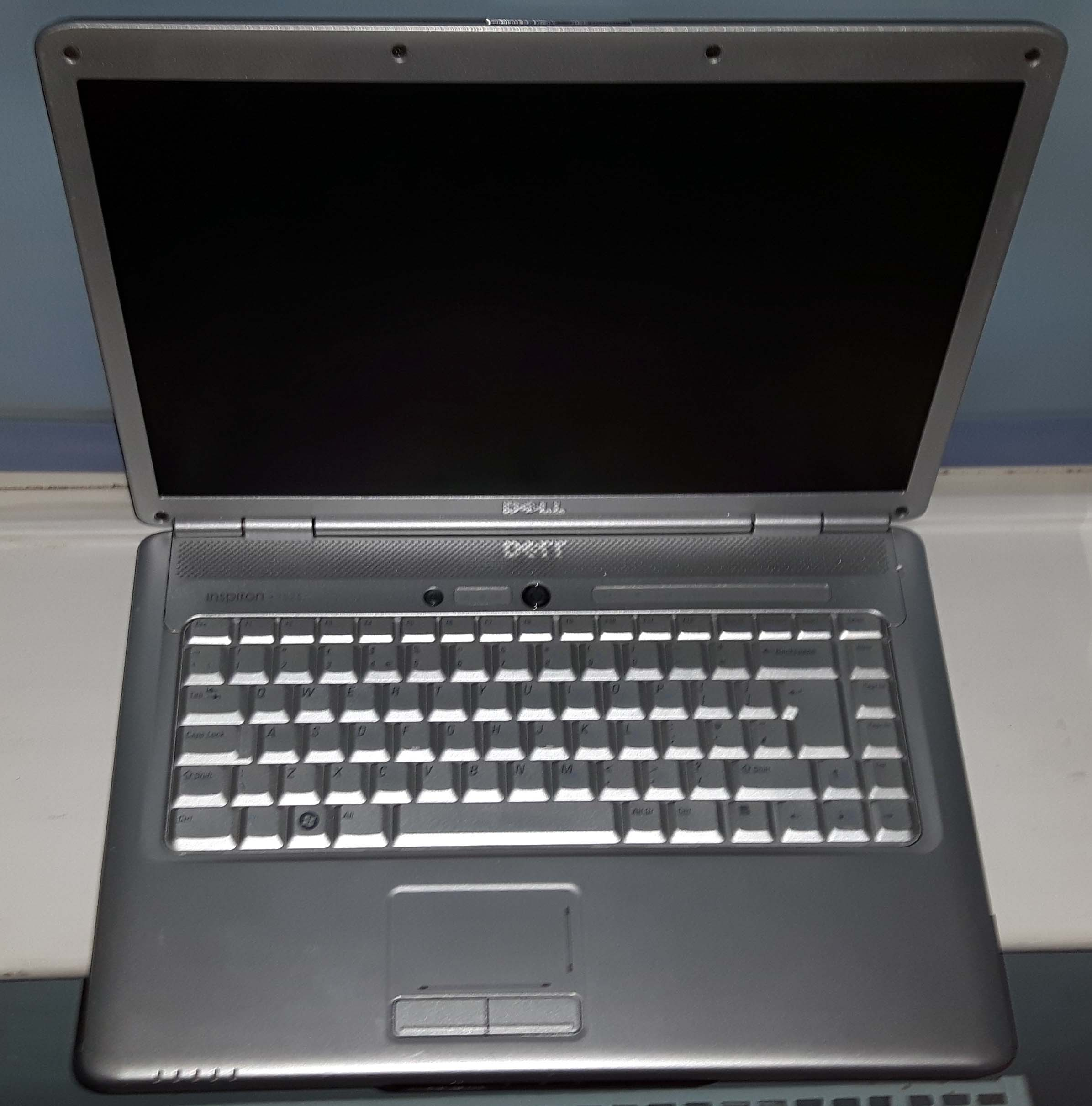
Inspiron 1525

The Inspiron 1525 was released on January 4, 2008. An AMD variant known as the Inspiron 1526 was also released. The Inspiron 1525 was the successor to the model 1520.

On June 26, 2008 it was followed with the release of the Inspiron 1535, otherwise known as the Dell Studio. On January 6, 2009, it was superseded by the Inspiron 1545, which featured some higher-end configuration options at a lower starting price, but lacked features such as the HDMI port, LED indicator lights and two headphone jacks.

It had a 15.4" display. It weighed approximately six pounds, which was half a pound lighter than the 1520. It could be considered a mid-range Dell computer, sitting between the smaller Dell model 1420 and the more expensive XPS M1530. It featured a chassis with a new 'edge' design, which still appears on all of Dell's current laptops; this was a departure from the design of previous Inspiron laptops, which were considered bulky and boxy.

- Processor: Intel Celeron 540, 550 or 560; Intel Pentium Dual-Core T2370, T2390, T2330, T4200, T4500; Intel Pentium/Intel Core 2 Duo T5250, T5450, T5550, T5750, T7250, T8100, T8300, T9300, T9500 or T3400.
- Memory: 512 MiB, or 1, 2, 3, 4, 5, or 6 GiB shared dual channel DDR2 SDRAM @ 667 or 800 MHz
- Chipset: Intel GM965 Express
- Graphics: Integrated Intel GMA X3100
- Display: 15.4" 1280x800, optionally with TrueLife, or 1440×900 with TrueLife
- Storage: 80, 120, 160, 250 or 320 GB SATA at 5400 RPM HDD
  - Optical drive: 8× tray-load dual-layer DVD+/-RW drive; 2× tray-load Blu-ray disc combo drive; or 2x Blu-ray disc burner
- Battery: 4-cell (28 Whr); 6-cell (56 Whr); or 9-cell (85 Whr) lithium-ion
- Wi-Fi: Broadcom 4312 based Dell Wireless 1397 802.11g half mini-card (Previously changed to 1395 802.11b/g full mini-card); or 1490 802.11a/g/n full mini-card (Broadcom 4311 based); or Intel Next-Gen 4965AGN 802.11a/g/n Wi-Fi
- Extendability: 1x Fast Ethernet; 56 kbit/s modem; S-Video output; 4x USB 2.0; 1x Express Card slot; VGA; HDMI; 1× FireWire (optional); 2x headphone jacks; microphone jack (optional); and power adapter.
- Wencam: Integrated 2.0 MP (optional)

The most notable difference to its predecessor was the 1520's dedicated graphics card, which the 1525 model did not have. Some believed that this was an attempt by Dell to appeal to a wider market of computer consumers. In a 2008 processor speed test, the Inspiron 1525 placed 14 out of the 18 tested. The touchpad was upgraded from that of the 1520, with the new one designed to allow faster scrolling through web pages. This model contained a SIM card slot underneath the battery compartment. However, the 1525 did not support reading data or using Internet from SIM cards without a separate wireless modem-card.

It typically came with Windows Vista, Windows 7 or Ubuntu 9.04 pre-installed (32-bit/64-bit). Models with Windows also included Microsoft Office 2007.

=== Reception ===
It received a great deal of positive attention. Owners welcomed the relatively low price, as well as the easily accessible volume control keys. Reviewers praised its customizability, as well as its specification and light frame. Users have made positive reference to the screen, with some describing the display as "flawless", also praising the inclusion of a webcam and dual headphone jacks. Some reviewers claimed that the battery life was a good point of the system.

Despite being a high-selling model, and receiving a large amount of positive feedback, it also attracted some level of criticism. Some critics felt that the sound quality was unfit for a recently produced laptop, claiming "raspy-sounding speakers" taking some of the shine off of its entertainment appeal, whereas others criticized the system's performance and battery life. The wireless switch was located on the right side of the bottom half, close to the front and could be easily overlooked. The positioning of the cooling fans rendered it incapable of supporting high-end graphics cards. Some users encountered technical problems, many of which centered around the webcam and built-in microphone. A common complaint was that the supplied fan was irritatingly loud. The placement of the headphone jacks on the front of the unit lead to inconvenient trailing wires when external speakers were connected. A touchpad design flaw caused the button to stick, requiring the replacement of the entire palm rest assembly. Users also reported numerous hard drive problems, many related to overheating.

=== Noteworthy hardware issues ===
It utilized a single heat sink to dissipate heat away from the CPU & GPU. Whilst it was not the only model that used a single copper alloy conduit, it was one of the more common. The models affected will combine the Intel Core 2 or Intel Dual Core CPU's.

CPU/GPU degradation over time was common, primarily due to extended overheating. While fan failure & vent blockages exacerbated these issues, in addition to general component failure from extended periods of overheating beyond tested component safety margins, which could cause product failure, or in some cases even a fire hazard.

For both the 1525 and 1526, a low power CMOS battery could prevent it from operating properly. Replacement when done the "right" way required removal of the main board, since the CMOS was located on its underside. However, there was a method that involved shimming the case open and using an angled pick to remove and replace the battery, but this method could lead to case damage if done without care.

== Inspiron 1764 (2009) ==
The Inspiron 1764 was introduced in 2009, and was noted for a fast processor, good sound, a medium hard disk drive, and a release price of US$679.

- CPU: Intel Core i3-330M (2.13 GHz) or i5-430M (2.26 GHz)
- Memory: 4 GiB DDR3 SDRAM
- Video card: ATI Mobility Radeon HD 5450/4330 (optional)
- Display: A 17.3" 1600x900 high-glossy TrueLife LCD. HDMI and VGA video outputs are available.
- Storage: 500 GB 2.5" 5400 rpm SATA HDD
- Expansion:'SD card slot, supporting MMC, SD and SDHC cards for additional storage
- Other: Webcam and Bluetooth adapter
- Connectivity: 10/100 Mbit Ethernet; IEEE 802.11a/b/g/n Wi-Fi; 4x USB 2.0; 7-in-1 Flash Memory card reader (SD, SDHC, MMC, xD-Picture Card, Memory Stick, Memory Stick PRO)
- Webcam: 1.3 megapixel
- Battery: 6-cell
- Dimensions: = 42.01 x 27.61 x 3.6 cm
- Weight: 2.88 kg (6.3 lb)

It was available in different colors and configurations. Colors include black, blue and pink. The configurations may differ in the presence of advanced display adapter.

It shipped with the Windows 7 operating system. Linux was reported to run well with the laptop's hardware, but required proprietary Broadcom drivers for the wireless network interface card when using some kernels where the integrated open-source drivers fail, and if using a version with an upgraded graphics card, required a proprietary ATI driver.

Some users noticed a problem with preinstalled software.

== Inspiron 1100 and 5100 Series (2003-2004) ==
Released in 2003 (2004 in the case of the 5160), the Inspiron 1100 and 5100 series consisted of five models: the Inspiron 1100, 1150, 5100, 5150, and 5160. Additionally, there was a rebadged version of these models sold as the Latitude 100L. The Inspiron 1100 and 1150 were the budget line of this series, the 5100 and 5160 was the mainstream line, and the 5150 was aimed towards higher end users. This model line were among the first Dell laptops to be offered in Dell’s new color scheme: Venice Blue and Moonlight Silver (1100, 5100, 5150), or Moonlight Silver (1150, 5160, 100L).

This model line was infamous for several well documented problems, which resulted in numerous class action lawsuits against Dell. These issues included: overheating, faulty motherboards, and power supply failures. More information can be found below.

Inspiron 1100:

- Processor: 2 GHz Intel Celeron M or 2.4 GHz Intel Pentium 4 M
- Memory: 256 MB @ 266 MHz (up to 1 GB)
- Graphics: Intel 82845G Graphics Controller 64 MB
- Storage: 30 GB or 40 GB HDD
- Display: 14.1 inch or 15 inch XGA display.

Inspiron 1150:

- Processor: 2.2 GHz Intel Celeron M, 2.4 GHz Intel Pentium 4 M, 2.8 GHz Pentium 4 M
- Memory: 256 MB @ 266 MHz (up to 1 GB)
- Graphics: Intel 852MV Graphics Controller 64 MB
- Storage: 30 GB, 40 GB, or 60 GB HDD
- Display: 14.1 inch or 15 inch XGA display.

Inspiron 5100:

- Processor: 2.4 GHz or 2.8 GHz Intel Pentium 4 Northwood
- Memory: 128 MB @ 266 MHz (up to 1 GB)
- Graphics: ATI Mobility Radeon 7500 Dedicated Graphics, 16 or 32 MB
- Storage: 30 GB or 40 GB HDD
- Display: 14.1 inch XGA display, 15 inch 1024x768 XGA display, 15 inch 1400x1500 XGA display.

Inspiron 5150:

- Processor: 3.06 GHz Intel Pentium 4 M
- Memory: 256 MB @ 333 MHz (up to 2 GB)
- Graphics: ATI Mobility Radeon 9000 Dedicated Graphics, 32 or 64 MB.
- Storage: 40 GB or 60 GB HDD
- Display: 15 inch XGA display or 15 inch UXGA (1600x1200 resolution) display.

Inspiron 5160:

- Processor: 2.8 GHz or 3.2 GHz Intel Pentium 4 M
- Memory: 512 MB @ 333 MHz (up to 2 GB)
- Graphics: Nvidia GeForce Go5200 Dedicated Graphics, 32 or 64 MB.
- Storage: 60 GB or 100 GB HDD
- Display: 15" 1024x768 XGA display or 15" 1400x1500 XGA display.

== Inspiron Mini Series ^{(2008–2010)} ==
The Dell Inspiron Mini Series is a sub-line of subnotebook/netbook computers designed by Dell. The series was introduced in September 2008 amidst the growing popularity of low-cost netbook computers introduced by competitors. This sub-line has since been discontinued.

== Inspiron 3000 series ==
=== Inspiron 11 3100 2-in-1 series (2014) ===
3147: — Released in 2014, The Inspiron 11 3000 Series 2-in-1 is a 2-in-1 notebook with an 11-inch touchscreen and Intel processors. It competes with Acer Aspire R 11, Asus Transformer Book Flip TP200, HP Pavilion x360, HP Stream x360, Lenovo Yoga 2 11 and Toshiba Satellite Radius 11.

- Processor: Intel Celeron or Pentium
- Memory: 4 GB
- Graphics: Intel HD Graphics
- Display: 11.6" LED Backlit Display, 1366x768 pixels
- Storage: SATA 500 GB (5400 RPM)
- Battery: 3-cell Lithium-Ion Battery
- Camera: HD 720p Web Camera
- Wireless: Wi-Fi: Intel Centrino Wireless-AC 3160; Bluetooth 4.0
- I/O ports: 2 USB 3.0, 1 USB 2.0, 1 HDMI port, 4-in-1 SD Card Reader, 1 Ethernet port, 1 combined headphone/microphone jack, 1 security lock, 1 power adapter port.

3148: — — this model features a HDMI port, 1x USB 3.0 and 2x USB 2.0 Type-A ports, a headphone/microphone combo (headset) port, a media-card reader and a security-cable slot. Its processors are from the 4th generation of Intel Core i3 processors with one SO-DIMM slot supporting DDR3L memory. It uses Intel HD graphics and the Realtek ALC3234 audio controller and a 2.5-inch HDD with SATA 3 Gbit/s capabilities. The laptop has an 11.6-inch HD WLED touchscreen display with a maximum resolution of 1366 × 768 and a refresh rate of 60 Hz. The integrated webcam above the display has a camera resolution is 0.92 megapixel and its maximum video recording resolution is 1280x720 (HD) at 30 FPS. The battery of the laptop is a 3 cell battery with a voltage of 11.4 VDC. The power adapter bundled with the laptop is capable of 65w and outputs a 3.34 A.

3158: — —

3168: — this model features a HDMI port, 1x USB 3.0 and 2x USB 2.0 Type-A ports, a headphone/microphone combo port, a microSD card reader, and a security cable slot. It comes with an Intel Celeron N3060, Intel Pentium N3170 or Intel Core-m3 CPU, each supporting up to 4 GB of RAM. There are 2 models, one that comes with the Intel Celeron CPU, 2 or 4 GB of RAM and a 32 GB eMMC drive. As the RAM and eMMC are soldered in, you cannot upgrade this model. The other version comes with either the Pentium or Core-m3 CPU, 2 or 4 GB of RAM socketed, and a 500 GB 2.5 inch HDD, upgradable to any SATA based 2.5 inch drive. Both models are touchscreen and comes in Bali Blue, Tango Red, white and later, Fog Grey. Matching wireless mice and laptop sleeves in those colors were offered as accessories.

=== Inspiron 11 3100 series ===
3162: — this model features a HDMI port, 1x USB 3.0 and 1x USB 2.0 Type-A ports, a headphone/microphone combo (headset) port and a media-card reader. The laptop uses either dual-core Intel Celeron or quad-core Intel Pentium processors. The audio controller inside the laptop is a Realtek ALC3234 and the multi-car reader supports one SD card in the form factor of micro SD card of the type being SD, SDHC or SDXC. The laptop has an 11.6-inch HD WLED display with a maximum resolution of 1366 × 768 and a refresh rate of 60 Hz. The integrated webcam above the display has a camera resolution is 0.92 megapixel and its maximum video recording resolution is 1280x720 (HD) at 30 FPS. The battery of the laptop is a 2-cell prismatic battery with a voltage of 7.6 VDC. The power adapter bundled with the laptop is capable of 45w and outputs a 2.31 A. The Dell Inspiron 3162 is available in three colors: red, white, and blue.

3180

=== Inspiron 14 3400 series ===
14" laptops under the Inspiron 3000 branding and equipped with Intel processors.

- 3452: - Intel (Celeron dual core or Pentium quad core) processor, Intel integrated graphics and 14-inch HD (1366 x 768) non-touch display.
- 3467: - Intel (6th generation Core i3 or 7th generation Core i3/i5/i7) processor, Intel HD Graphics (520 or 620) or AMD Radeon R5 M430 and 14-inch HD (1366 x 768) non-touch display.
- 3473: - Intel (Pentium Silver N5000 or Celeron N4000) processor, Intel UHD Graphics (600 or 605) and 14-inch HD (1366 x 768) non-touch display.
- 3476: - Intel (8th generation Core i5/i7) processor, Intel UHD Graphics 620 and or AMD Radeon 520 and 14-inch HD (1366 x 768) non-touch display.

=== Inspiron 15 3500 series ===
==== Intel ====
15" laptops under the Inspiron 3000 branding and equipped with Intel processors.

- 3510 — Intel Pentium Silver n5030 - 4gb DDR3 RAM - 128gb SSD storage, Intel UHD Graphics 605, Intel Wireless-AC 9462 - 13" by 16" FHD, LED backlit screen - 1 charger port - 2 USB 1.0 ports, and 1 HDMI port on the charger side. On the other side, there is a headphone jack, a USB 2.0 port, and a regular SD card slot.
- 3520 — Intel i3-i7 10th - current gen processors 4gb, 8gb, 16gb, DDR3 - present RAM, 256gb-1024gb SSD storage, Intel iRIS Xe integrated graphics, Intel WI-FI AX201, 15.6" FHD, LED backlit, two USB 3.0 ports on the left side and one USB 2.0 on the right side, HD webcam and more. View more information at Dell's official website.
- 3542
- 3552: — Intel Celeron processor N3060, 4 GB memory, 512 GB hard drive, integrated Intel HD graphics, DVD+/-RW drive, Wireless-AC/Bluetooth, 4-cell battery, media card reader, HDMI and USB 3.0 ports, 15.6" HD LED-backlit display
- 3558 — —
- 3573
- 3576
- 3582 - Intel Celeron N4000, 4GB memory, 1 TB HDD, Windows 10/11 or Ubuntu 18.04
- 3583 - Inspiron 3583 has Intel's 8th Gen Core i3-8145U and Intel's UHD 620 Graphics.
- 3584: — Fully customizable, with up to an intel Core i7, 16 GB memory, 2 TB HDD, 256 GB SSD, and AMD Radeon 535 graphics. Comes as standard with three USB 3.1 ports, one USB 2.0 port, a combination headphone/microphone 3.5 mm port, a HDMI 1.4 port, an SD card reader, a Noble wedge lock slot and a 10/100 Mbps RJ45 Ethernet port.

==== AMD ====
15" laptops under the Inspiron 3000 branding and equipped with AMD processors.

- 3555 —
- 3541 —
- 3525

and the 3151

== Inspiron 5000 Series ==
=== Inspiron 13 5300 2-in-1 series ===
5368: —

- Processor: 6th gen Intel Core i5-6300u (2.4 GHz) or i7-6600U (2.6 GHz)
- Memory: 8 GB (Expandable up to 16 GB)
- Display: 13" LED-backlit, 1920 x 1080, 10 point multi-touch touchscreen
- Graphics: Intel HD 520

5378: —

- Processor: 7th gen Intel Core i3-7100U (2.4 GHz), i5-7200U (3.10 GHz) or i7-7500U (4M Cache, up to 3.50 GHz) Dual-core
- Memory: 4 GB or 8 GB (Expandable up to 16 GB)
- Graphics: Intel HD 620
- Storage: SATA 2.5" (500 GB, 1 TB HDD)
- Display: 13" LED-backlit, 1920 x 1080, Limited HDR support; 10 point multi-touch touchscreen

5379: —

- Processor: 8th gen Intel Core i5-8250U (3.40 GHz) or i7-8550U (8M Cache, up to 4.00 GHz)
- Memory: 8 GB (Expandable up to 32 GB)
- Display: 13" LED-backlit, 1920 x 1080, 10 point multi-touch touchscreen
- Graphics: Intel HD 620

=== Inspiron 14 5400 series ===
5420: — 3rd Generation Intel Core i3, i5 or i7; or AMD A4-4300M, A6-4400M, A8-4500M, A10-4600M.

5457: — Intel Pentium or 6th gen Core i3/i5/i7.

5480: — 8th gen Whisky Lake Intel Core i3/i5/i7.

5485: — 2019 2-in-1 model with Athlon 300U or Ryzen 3/4/5 3200U, 3500U or 3700U mobile processor

5490: — 2019's model with 10th gen i3, i5 and i7 with up to 16 gb ram and 1 tb ssd and graphics card up to Gtx 1650ti (4 GB)

5402: — 2020's model, Intel 11th gen up to i7-1165G7 processor; Up to 12 GB (one slot + 4 GB) DDR4, 3200 MHz. aluminium cover and palmrest, fingerprint reader option. 1920 x 1080 IPS screen.

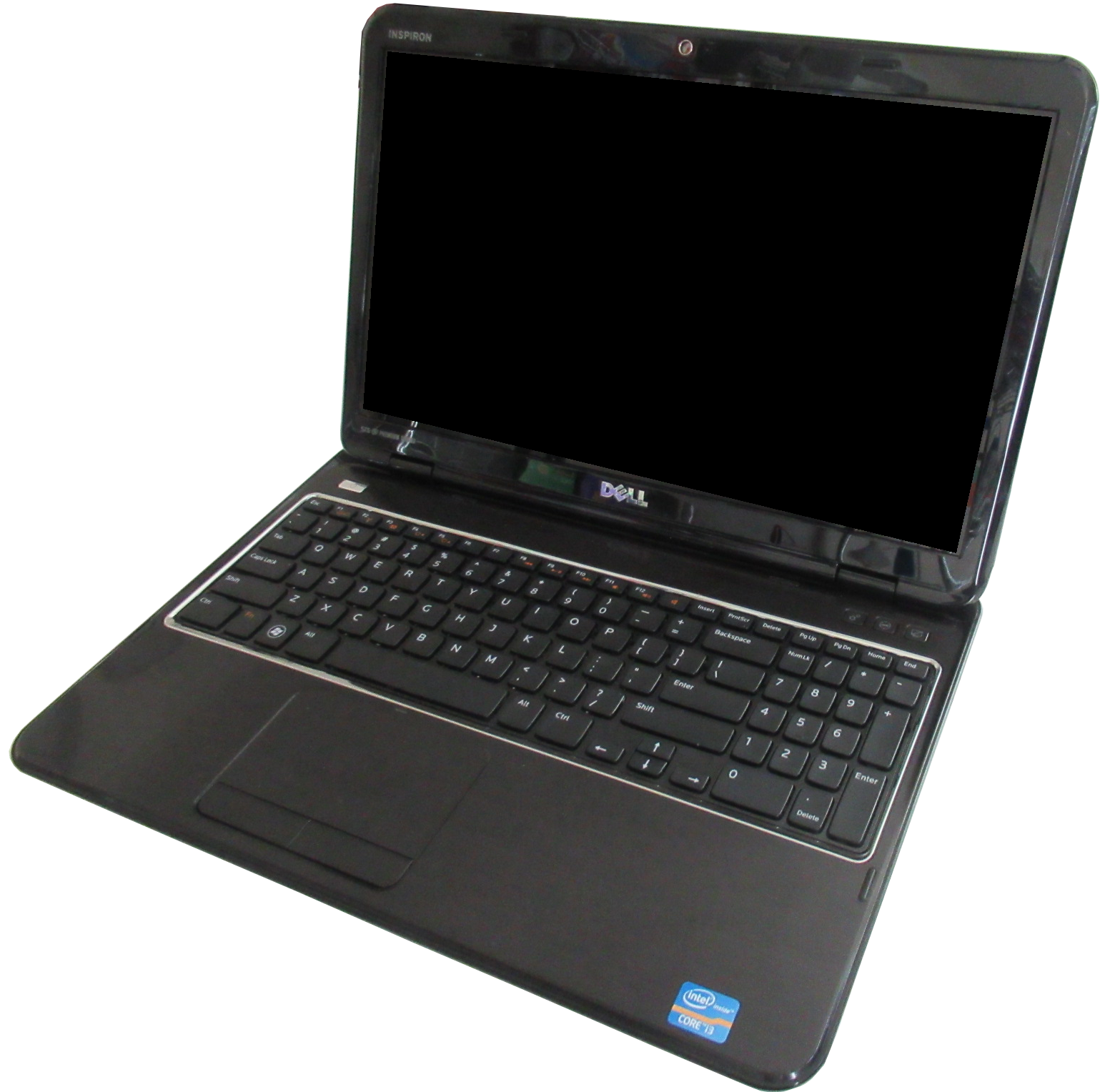
Dell Inspiron 15R N5110 shown with lid open

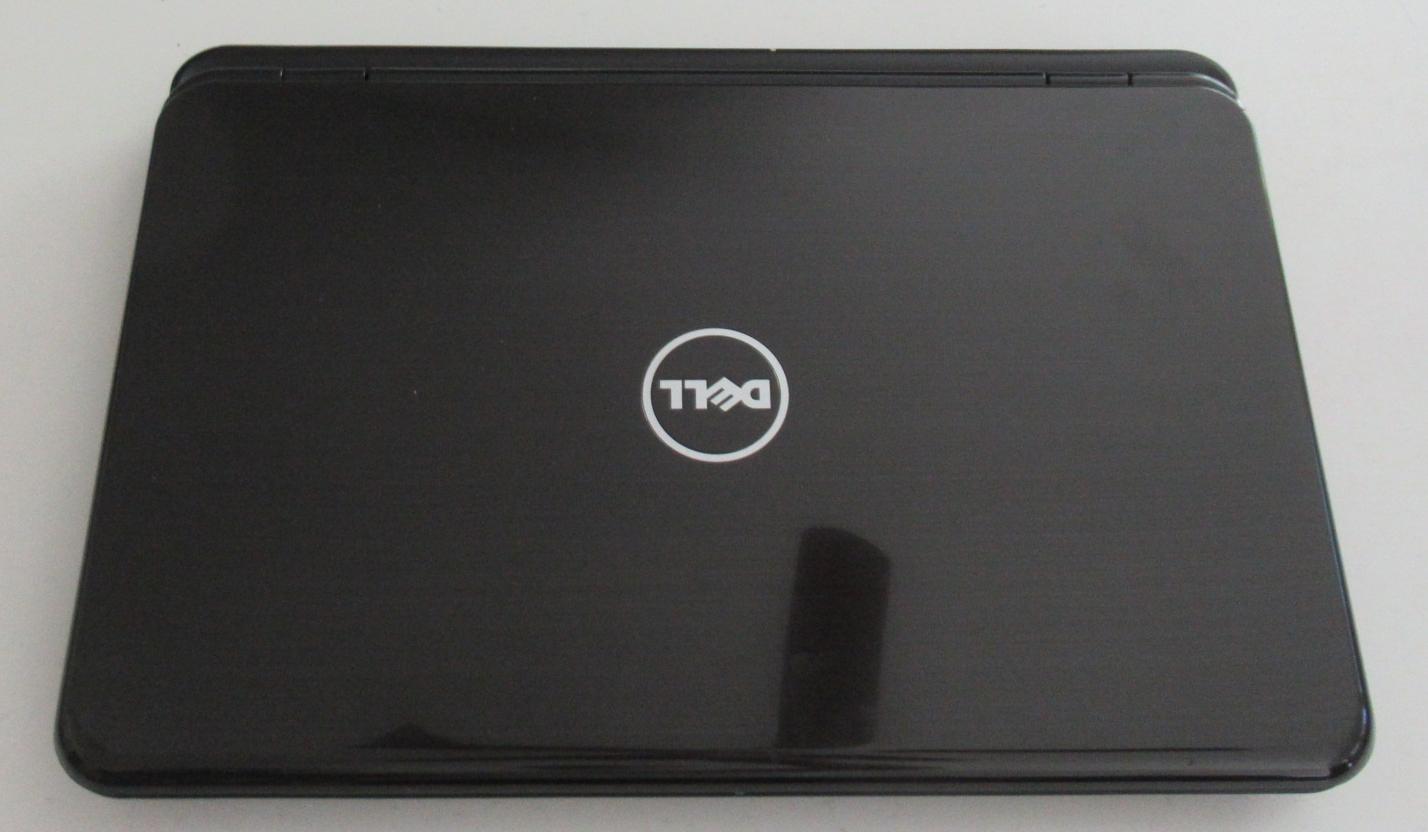
Dell Inspiron 15R N5110 shown with lid closed

=== Inspiron 15R N5000 (2011) ===
N5110 - Predecessor model N5010. The N5110 released in 2011 with Intel Sandy Bridge platform, options for processors i3, i5 and i7.

- Processor: Intel Core i3-2310M, i5-2450M or i7-2670QM.
- RAM Memory: 1333 MHz DDR3 (2 slots), 2 GB up to 8 GB
- Graphics: Intel HD 3000 onboard or Nvidia GeForce GT 525M discrete card
- Display: 15.6" LED Backlit Display, 1366x768 pixels
- Storage: SATA, HDD (5400 RPM)
- Optical Drive: Yes
- Battery: 6-cell 4140 mAh Li-Ion
- Camera: HD 720p Web Camera
- Audio Controller: IDT 92HD87, speakers 2 x 2 Watt
- Wi-Fi and Bluetooth: Intel Centrino Wireless-N 1030 + Bluetooth 4.0
- I/O ports: 2 USB 3.0, 1 USB 2.0, 1 eSATA, 1 HDMI port, 1 VGA (D-Sub) port, 4-in-1 SD Card Reader, 1 Ethernet port, 1 headphone, 1 microphone jack, 1 security lock, 1 power adapter port.
- Dimensions and weight: 2.6 kg with battery, 376 mm width, 260.2 mm depth, 35.3 mm rear to 30.7 mm front height

=== Inspiron 15 5500 2-in-1 series ===
5568

=== Inspiron 15 5500 series ===
5502—

5520: — 3rd Generation Intel Core i3, i5 or i7; or AMD A4-4300M, A6-4400M, A8-4500M, A10-4600M.

5521: — 3rd Generation Intel Core i3, i5 or i7.

5537: — 4th Generation Intel Core i3, i5 or i7 with AMD Radeon Graphics.

5545: — AMD A8-7100 APU or AMD-7300 APU.

5547: — Laptop available in i5 (Non-Touch/Touch Screen), i7 (Non-Touch/Touch Screen), AMD 18 (Non-Touch) versions.

- Processor: Intel Core i5-4210U or i7-4510U, AMD A8.
- Memory: 8 or 12 GB, up to 16 GB DDR3L (2 slots)
- Graphics: Intel HD 4400
- Display: 15.6" LED Backlit Display, 1366x768 pixels
- Storage: SATA, HDD 1 TB (5400 RPM)
- Optical Drive: Yes
- Battery: 3-cell Li-Ion
- Camera: HD 720p Web Camera
- Wi-Fi and Bluetooth: Intel Centrino Wireless-AC 3160 + Bluetooth 4.0
- I/O ports: 2 USB 3.0, 1 USB 2.0, 1 HDMI port, 4-in-1 SD Card Reader, 1 Ethernet port, 1 combined headphone/microphone jack, 1 security lock, 1 power adapter port.

5548: — Intel Core 5th generation i5/i7 processors.

5551: — Intel (Celeron or Pentium) processors.

5552: — Intel (Celeron or Pentium) processors. 1 DDR3L RAM slot (up to 8 GB).

5555: —

- Processor: AMD APU: E1-7010, E2-7110, A4-7210 @1.8 GHz, A6-7310 @2 GHz, A8-7410 @2.2 GHz, or A10-8700P @1.8 GHz
- Memory: 4, 8, 12, or 16 GB DDR3L 1600 MHz (2 slots)
- Graphics: AMD Radeon R2, R3, R4, R5, or R6 Integrated
- Display: 15.6" Dell TrueLife Non-touch or touch 1366x768
- Storage: Seagate Thin HDD SATA 500 GB, 1 TB, or 2 TB (5400 RPM) or 128/256 GB SSD
- Optical Drive: TSSCorp DVD-RW
- Battery: 4-cell 40 WHr or 47 WHr Li-Ion
- Camera: HD 720p, with stereo microphones
- Wi-Fi and Bluetooth: Dell Wireless 1707 Card (802.1b/g/n + Bluetooth 4.0, 2.4 GHz)
- I/O ports: 1 USB 3.0, 2 USB 2.0, 1 HDMI 1.4a port, SD Card Reader, 1 Ethernet port, 1 combined headphone/microphone jack, 1 security lock, 1 power adapter port.
- Keyboard: Full-size non-backlit or backlit spill-resistant keyboard w/ number pad

5557: — 6th generation Intel Core i3/i5/i7 processors.

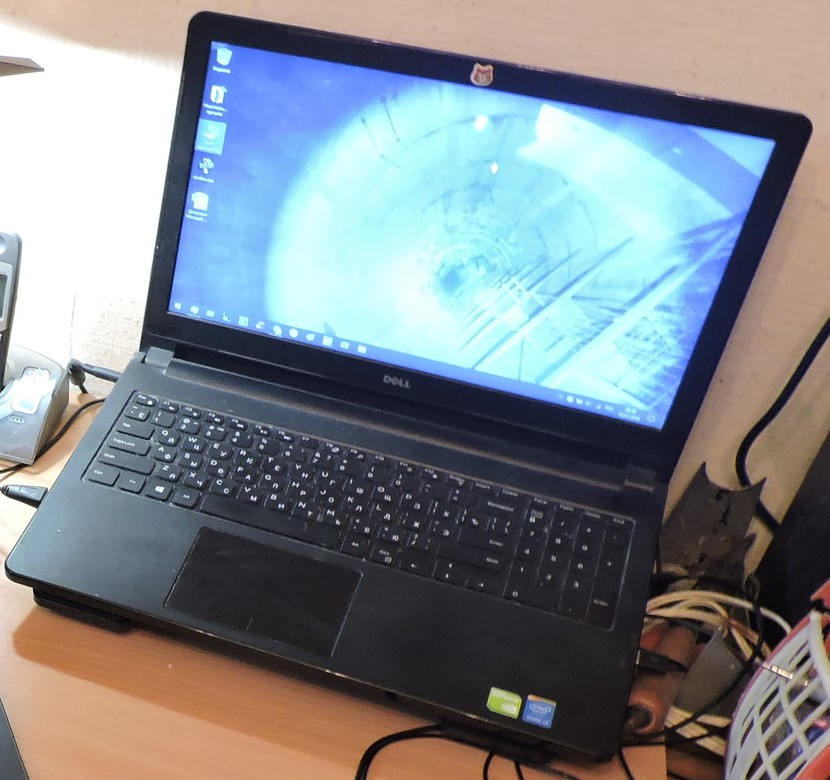
Inspiron 15 (5558)

5558: —

- Processor: Intel Broadwell microarchitecture
- Memory: 4, 8, or up to 16 GB DDR3L-1600 (2 slots)

5559: —

- Processor: Intel Core 6th generation i3/15/i7 or Celeron/Pentium processors
- Memory: 4, 6, 8, or up to 16 GB DDR3L-1600 (2 slots)
- Graphics: Intel Integrated Graphics 510 / 520 (integrated) or AMD Radeon R5 M335 (discrete)
- Display: 15.6" LED-backlit, 1366x768 or 1920x1080 pixels
- Pen/Touch: can be equipped with or without 10-point touch screen
- Keyboard: Full size keyboard (can be equipped with backlight)

5566: — Features Intel Kaby Lake Microprocessors.

- Processor: Intel Core i7-7500U, or i5-7200U.
- Memory: 8 GB, DDR4 (2 slots)
- Graphics: Intel HD 610 or 620
- Display: 15.6" LED-backlit, 1366x768 pixels
- Storage: SATA: 256/512 GB (SSD), 1 TB (5400 RPM HDD)
- Optical Drive: Yes
- Battery: 6-cell Li-Ion
- Camera: HD 720p Web Camera
- Wi-Fi and Bluetooth: Intel Centrino Wireless-AC 3160 + Bluetooth 4.0
- I/O ports: 2 USB 3.0, 1 USB 2.0, 1 HDMI port, 4-in-1 SD Card Reader, 1 Ethernet port, 1 combined headphone/microphone jack, 1 security lock, 1 power adapter port.

5567: — Features Intel Kaby Lake Microprocessors

5570: — Released in 2017, and has a starting price of €599. Intel Celeron or Pentium, or 6th gen Core i3, or 7th gen Core i3/i5/i7, or 8th gen Core i3/i5/i7 processors.

5593: — Released in 2020, Up to 10th Generation Intel Core i5-1035G1, integrated graphics, m.2 NVME SSD.

=== Inspiron 17 5700 series ===
5720: —

- Processor: Intel Pentium dual core / Intel Core i3, i5 or i7.
- Memory: Between 2 and 8 GB of 1333/1600 MHz DDR3 SODIMM (2 slots). 16 GB of memory is unofficially supported.
- Graphics: Nvidia GeForce GT 630M dedicated GPU with 1 GB GDDR5 discrete memory + 1 GB shared system memory and Intel HD 4000 integrated GPU with up to 2 GB shared system memory.
- Display: 17.3" LED Backlit Display (60Hz refresh rate), 1920x1080 pixels max. resolution.
- Storage: 500 GB HDD or 1 TB HDD (SATA, 5400 rpm). Optional mSATA interface supporting up to 32 GB of additional SSD storage.
- Optical Drive: DVD-RW or Blu-Ray.
- Battery: 6-cell Li-Ion
- Camera: HD 720p Web Camera
- Audio: IDT 92HD94 audio codec, two 2-watt Skullcandy speakers + subwoofer, microphone in camera assembly, headphone and microphone jacks.
- Wi-Fi and Bluetooth: Intel Centrino Wireless-N 2230.
- I/O ports: 4 USB 3.0 ports, 1 HDMI port, 1 VGA port, 1 8-in-1 SD Card Reader, 1 Ethernet port, 1 power adapter port.

5755: — AMD A8-7410 or AMD A10-8700P processors.

5758: — Intel (Pentium or 4th gen Core i3 or 5th gen Core i3/i5/i7) processors.

5759: — Intel 6th gen i3/i5/i7 processors.

5767: — up to Intel Core i7-7500U, 8 GB RAM and a Radeon R7 M445 (2 GB)

5770: — Intel (Celeron or Pentium or 6th gen Core i3 or 7th gen Core i3/i5/i7 or 8th gen i3/i5/i7) processors.

5775: — 2nd generation AMD Ryzen U-series processors.

== Inspiron 7000 Series ==
=== Inspiron 13 7300 series ===
- 7380: — 8th Gen Intel CPU; 16 GB DDR4 memory.

=== Inspiron 13 7300 2-in-1 series ===
Inspiron 13 7000 2-in-1 is a 2-in-1 notebook line with a 13-inch touchscreen, Intel processors and aluminum case. It competes with Acer Aspire R 14, Asus Transformer Book Flip, HP Pavilion 13 x360, Lenovo Yoga 3, Samsung Notebook 7 spin (13-inch), Toshiba Satellite Radius 12 and 14.

- 7348: — Late 2014 — 5th gen Intel Core i3/i5/i7 - 1600 MHz DDR3L memory 4 or 8 GB (1 slot)
- 7352: — Late 2014 - 5th gen Intel Core i5/i7 - 1600 MHz DDR3L memory 4 or 8 GB (1 slot)
- 7353: — Early 2015 - 6th gen Intel Core i5/i7 - 1600 MHz DDR3L memory 4 or 8 GB (1 slot)
- 7359: — Late 2015 - 6th gen Intel Core i3/i5/i7 or Pentium Dual Core processor - 1600 MHz DDR3L memory 4 or 8 GB (1 slot)
- 7368: — Late 2016 - 6th gen Intel Core i3/i5/i7 or Celeron/Pentium Dual Core processor - 2133 MHz DDR4 memory (4/8/12/16 GB - 2 slots)
- 7375: — Late 2017 - AMD Ryzen 3 / 5 / 7 processor - 2400 MHz DDR4 memory (4/8/12/16 GB - 2 slots) - HD or FHD Display
- 7378: — Late 2016 / 2017 - 7th gen Intel Core i3/i5/i7 or Celeron/Pentium Dual Core processor - 2133 MHz DDR4 memory (4/8/12/16 GB - 2 slots) - HD or FHD Display
- 7373: — Late 2017 - 8th gen Intel Core i5/i7 processor - 2133 MHz or 2400 MHz DDR4 memory 8 or 16 GB (Soldered to motherboard) - FHD Display
- 7386: — Late 2018 / 2019 - 8th gen Intel Core i5/i7 processor - 2400 MHz DDR4 memory 8 or 16 GB (Soldered to motherboard) - FHD or UHD Display
- 7391: — Late 2019 / 2020 - 10th gen Intel Core i5/i7 processor - 2133 MHz LPDDR3 memory 8 or 16 GB (Soldered to motherboard) - FHD or UHD Display

=== Inspiron 14 7400 series ===
7420: — 12th Generation Intel Core i3, i5 or i7; or AMD A4-4300M, A6-4400M, A8-4500M, A10-4600M.

=== Inspiron 14 2-in-1 7400 series ===
7420/7425 - Intel variant (7420) with 12th Gen i5-1235U/i7-1255U with Iris Xe Graphics, and AMD Variant (7425) with Ryzen 5 5625U/Ryzen 7 5825U with Radeon Graphics. 8 or 16 GB DDR4 3200 MHz RAM. FHD+ Display. Marketed as "New Inspiron 14 2-in-1" or simply "Inspiron 14 2-in-1".

=== Inspiron 15 7500 series ===
7520 SE: —

- Processor: AMD A4-4300M, A6-4400M, A8-4500M or A10-4600M / Intel Pentium dual core / Intel Core i3, i5 or i7.
- Memory: Between 2 and 8 GB of 1600 MHz DDR3 SODIMM (2 slots). 16 GB of memory is unofficially supported.
- Graphics: AMD Radeon HD 7730M dedicated GPU with 2 GB discrete memory and Intel HD 4000 integrated GPU with up to 2 GB shared system memory.
- Display: 15.6" LED Backlit Display (60Hz refresh rate), 1920x1080 pixels max. resolution.
- Storage: 500 GB HDD or 1 TB HDD (SATA, 5400 rpm). Optional mSATA interface supporting up to 32 GB of additional SSD storage.
- Optical Drive: DVD-RW or Blu-Ray.
- Battery: 6-cell Li-Ion
- Camera: HD 720p Web Camera
- Audio: Conexant "SmartAudio HD" CX20672-21Z audio codec, two 2-watt Skullcandy speakers, microphone in camera assembly, headphone and microphone jacks.
- Wi-Fi and Bluetooth: Intel Centrino Wireless-N 2230.
- I/O ports: 4 USB 3.0 ports, 1 HDMI port, 1 VGA port, 1 8-in-1 SD Card Reader, 1 Ethernet port, 1 power adapter port.

7559: — 6th generation Intel Core i5/i7 processors.

7566: — 6th generation Intel Core i5/i7 processors.

7567: — 7th generation Intel Core i5/i7 processors.

7577: — 7th generation Intel Core i5/i7 processors (with USB Type-C).

7570: — 8th generation Intel Core i5/i7 processors (with USB Type-C).

7580: — 8th generation Intel Core i5/i7 processors (with USB Type-C).

7590: — 9th generation Intel Core i5/i7 processors (with USB Type-C).

7501: — 10th generation Intel Core i5/i7 processors (with USB Type-C).

7510: — 11th generation Intel Core i5/i7 processors (with USB Type-C).

=== Inspiron 15 7000 2-in-1 (2015) ===
Released in 2015, The Inspiron 15 7000 Series 2-in-1 is a 2-in-1 notebook with a 15-inch touchscreen and Intel processors. It competes with Acer Aspire R 15, Asus Transformer Book Flip TP500, TP550, HP Envy x360, Lenovo Flex 2 15, 3 15, Samsung Notebook 7 spin (15-inch) and Toshiba Satellite Fusion.

- 7558: — 5th generation Intel Core i5/i7 processors.
- 7569: — 6th generation Intel Core i5/i7 processors.
- 7579: — 7th generation Intel Core i5/i7 processors (with USB Type-C).
- 7573: — 8th generation Intel Core i5/i7 processors (with USB Type-C).
- 7586: — 8th generation Intel Core i5/i7 processors (with USB Type-C)
- 7591: — 10th generation Intel Core i5/i7 processors (with USB Type-C).

=== Inspiron 17 7700 series ===
7720 SE: —

- Processor: Intel Core i5-3210M or Intel Core i7-3610QM / i7-3630QM / i7-3612QM or Intel Core i7-3632QM.
- Memory: Between 2 and 8 GB of 1333/1600 MHz DDR3 SODIMM (2 slots). 16 GB of memory is unofficially supported.
- Graphics: NVIDIA GeForce GT 650M dedicated GPU with 2 GB GDDR5 discrete memory and Intel HD 4000 integrated GPU with up to 2 GB shared system memory.
- Display: 17.3" LED Backlit Display (60Hz refresh rate) with optional NVIDIA 3D support (120Hz refresh rate), 1920x1080 pixels max. resolution.
- Storage: 500 GB HDD or 1 TB HDD (SATA, 5400 rpm). Optional mSATA interface supporting up to 32 GB of additional SSD storage.
- Optical Drive: DVD-RW or Blu-Ray.
- Battery: 6-cell Li-Ion
- Camera: HD 720p Web Camera
- Audio: IDT 92HD94 audio codec, two 2-watt Skullcandy speakers + subwoofer, microphone in camera assembly, headphone and microphone jacks.
- Wi-Fi and Bluetooth: Intel Centrino Wireless-N 2230.
- I/O ports: 4 USB 3.0 ports, 1 HDMI port, 1 VGA port, 1 8-in-1 SD Card Reader, 1 Ethernet port, 1 power adapter port.

7737: — 4th generation Intel Core i3/i5/i7 processors.

7746: — 5th generation Intel Core i5/i7 processors.

=== Inspiron 17 7700 2-in-1 series ===
The Inspiron 17 7000 series 2-in-1 is a convertible line with aluminum case. It uses a 17-inch display, and is the largest Inspiron 2-in-1 laptop.

- 7778: —
  Dell Inspiron 17 7778 2-in-1
  - Introductory price: $1,049.99
  - CPU: Intel Core i5 or i7
  - Memory: 16 GB, DDR4, 2400 MHz
  - Storage: 1 TB 5400 rpm HDD; 128 GB SSD
  - Display: 17.3" FHD 1920 × 1080 Truelife LED-Backlit Touch with Wide Viewing Angles
  - Graphics: NVIDIA GeForce 940MX 2 GB GDDR5
  - Sound: 2 tuned speakers; audio processing by Waves MaxxAudio Pro; 1 combo audio jack
  - Camera: HD (720p) Infrared Webcam w/Dual Digital Microphone Array
  - Connectivity: 1 USB Type C 1 USB 3.0 (PowerShare); 1 USB 2.0; Media Card Reader (SD, SDHC, SDXC)
  - Power: 56 WHr, 4-Cell Battery (integrated)
  - Dimensions: H:0.87–0.89 in (22–22.6 mm); W: 16.24 inches (412.5 mm); D: 10.93 inches (277.6 mm)
  - Weight: Starting at 2.77 kilograms (6.11 lb) with 4 GB RAM, Full-HD display, SSD
- 7786: — 8th gen Intel Core i5/i7 processor.
- 7790: — Up to 16 GB DDR4, Nvidia 250MX video.

== Inspiron Gaming Series (Pandora) (2015–2018) ==
=== Inspiron 14 Gaming/Inspiron 14 7000 (7447) ===
The 2015 Dell Inspiron 7447 (Inspiron 14) is a gaming oriented laptop with a discrete 4 GB Nvidia GeForce GTX 850M. It has either an Intel i5-4210H or the Intel i7-4710HQ with up to 8 GB of DDR3L RAM and expandable up to 16 GB.

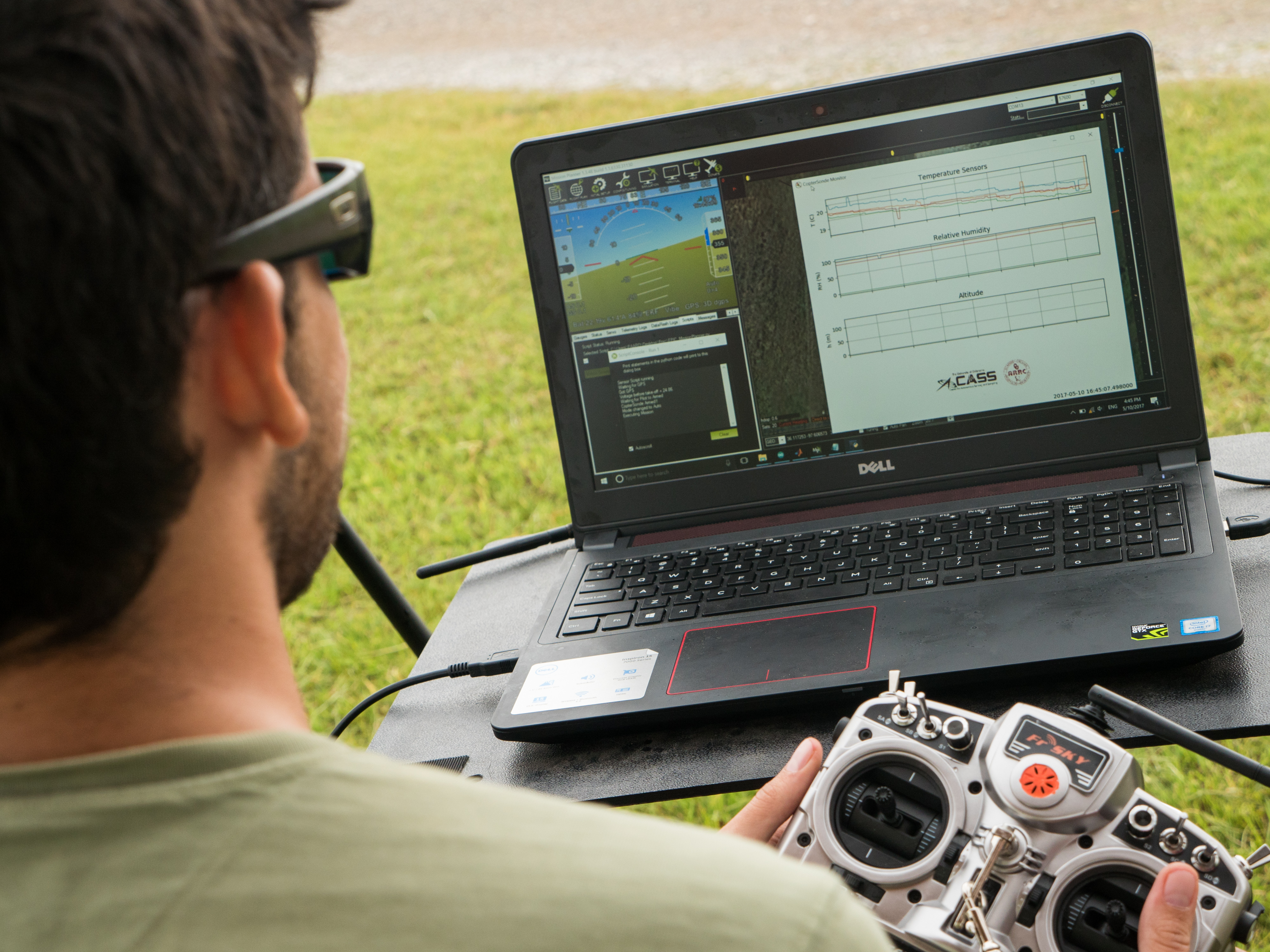
Inspiron 15 7000 (7559)

=== Inspiron 15 Gaming/Inspiron 15 7000 (7559) ===
The Dell Inspiron 7559 (Inspiron 15) is a gaming-oriented laptop with discrete Nvidia GeForce GTX 960M and comes in black with red trim plastic case. The RAM is standard at 8 GB of DDR3L RAM and expandable up to 16 GB. It competes with the HP Pavilion Gaming Series and HP Omen.

=== Inspiron 15 7500 gaming series ===
7566 — The Inspiron 15 changes the styling from the Inspiron 15 7000 (7559) while retaining the Nvidia GeForce GTX 960M dedicated graphics card.

7567 — These model has the same design as the Inspiron 15 Gaming (7566) with the main difference being the replacement of the Nvidia GeForce GTX 960M with either a GeForce GTX 1050 or GeForce GTX 1050Ti. The laptop uses DDR4 RAM which can be upgraded to 32 GB and has one M.2 slot for an SSD and one M.2 slot for a wireless card. The screen was improved by switching from a TN to IPS LCD.

7577 — The 2018's model changes the styling of the fan and speaker grills from the Inspiron 15 7000 Gaming (7567). The Nvidia GeForce GTX 1050 graphics card was replaced with a GeForce GTX 1060 Max-Q for improved performance.

=== Inspiron 15 5000 Gaming (AMD) (5576) ===
The Dell Inspiron 15 5000 Gaming (AMD) (5576) is a lower-priced gaming-oriented laptop using either 7th generation AMD (FX 9830P or A10 9630P) Quad Core processors. The integrated video controller is an AMD Radeon R5 or R7 with shared system memory and its discrete video controller is an AMD Radeon RX460 with 4 GB GDDR5 memory. Like the Inspiron 15 7000 Gaming series, the laptop uses DDR4 RAM which can be upgraded to 32 GB and has one M.2 slot for an SSD and one M.2 slot for a wireless card. The I/O includes one Ethernet port, one USB 3.0 port with PowerShare, two USB 3.0 data ports, one HDMI port, and one headset port. The audio controller used is a Realtek ALC3246 with Waves MaxxAudio Pro with two speakers and one subwoofer. The card reader is a 2-in-1 type supporting SD card and MultiMedia card (MMC). The webcam is capable of 1 megapixel still images and 720p HD video at 30 fps. The display used is a 15.6-inch FHD non-touch screen with a refresh rate of 60 Hz.

The Inspiron Gaming Series (Pandora) was replaced by Dell G Series in 2018.

== Rebadging ==
In the past, Dell has modified some existing Inspiron machines to produce computers of higher or lower quality. For instance, several Dell XPS laptops and Inspiron models shared the same chassis for several years, and most of them had similar hardware specifications with each other, only differing with the options and features specific to each individual model.

The first-generation Inspiron XPS and Inspiron 9100 (2004) are similar models, and both of them shared the same options in processors (desktop Intel Pentium 4 HT "Prescott" or Intel Pentium 4 Extreme Edition "Gallatin"), RAM (DDR 400 MHz), hard-drives (Ultra-ATA 5400/7200 rpm), wireless cards, LCD screens (at 15.4-inches; WXGA, WSXGA+, WUXGA) and graphics cards (ATI Mobility Radeon 9700 64 MB/128 MB or ATI Mobility Radeon 9800 64 MB/128 MB), as well as using the same chassis. They were also very heavy laptops, weighing in at about 9.06 lb. In terms of their target audiences, Dell marketed the 1st-gen XPS as the "ultimate gaming machine" while the 9100 was marketed as a "desktop replacement". The Inspiron 9100 is essentially a rebadged 1st-gen XPS with the only difference being the LCD panel. While both models supports a 15.4" Samsung LCD, only the later models of the 9100 (with a 3.2 GHz CPU) use an identical LCD screen as the 1st-gen XPS with resolutions up to 1920×1200 (Dell Part #s 7T774/W3866) whereas previous Inspiron 9100s (with a 2.8-3.0 GHz CPU) used a different LCD screen with resolutions of up to 1280×800 (Dell Part # Y0316).

The second-generation Inspiron XPS (rebranded XPS M170 with GeForce Go 7800 GTX GPU) and Inspiron 9300 (2005) were also similar models, both sharing the same hardware and chassis as with the previous 1st-gen Inspiron XPS and Inspiron 9100 but had their processors changed to mobile ones (the desktop Pentium 4 processors were replaced with the less-hot, lower-clocked and more power-efficient Pentium M processors) and were made lighter than prior models, being reduced to about 8.6 lb. The new models were also part of the Intel Centrino platform-marketing brand, with the two laptops being based on the Sonoma platform. The main differences between the two are the graphics cards, which on the XPS used NVIDIA GeForce Go 6800 Ultra/7800 GTX GPUs whereas the Inspiron 9300 used ATI Mobility Radeon X300 GPUs in the base models. Both models featured a 17" LCD screen with the Inspiron 9300 using a slightly lower resolution screen than the XPS with resolutions of up to 1440×900.

The third-generation XPS (known as the XPS M1710), Inspiron 9400/E1705 and the Precision M90 (2006) all shared the same hardware, chassis and components with each other as with the previous 2nd-gen Inspiron XPS and Inspiron 9300 in terms of processor choices and other options, with the chassis of the 3rd-gen XPS being built on the latter Precision mobile workstation. These laptops were based on the Napa platform of the Intel Centrino brand name. Again, the main differences between them are the graphics cards, which on the XPS used NVIDIA GeForce Go 7900 GS/7900 GTX GPUs whereas the Inspiron 9400/E1705 used Intel GMA 950 integrated GPUs or ATI Mobility Radeon X1400 discrete GPUs in the base models and the Precision M90 using NVIDIA Quadro FX 1500M/2500M GPUs. All of them shared the same 17" LCD screens with each models from different lines using different resolutions.

The practice of sharing the same chassis between the Inspiron and XPS line of laptops started to be phased out with the release of the fourth-generation XPS (the XPS M1730) in 2007, featuring a completely new and redesigned chassis separate from the other previously released Dell laptops of the time, including mainline Inspiron laptops. The new chassis takes some design cues with the equivalent Inspiron 1700/1720 and Vostro 1700 (2007) models, and few of the hardware and components were shared between the aforementioned Inspiron and Vostro laptops. Based on the Santa Rosa platform of the Intel Centrino brand name, the 4th-gen XPS has a 17" LCD screen like its predecessors, which was also shared with the Inspiron 1700/1720 and Vostro 1700 laptops with each of them using different resolutions.

Following the release of the XPS M1730 in 2007, later XPS laptops produced since 2010 no longer shared the same chassis with other Dell laptops (including Inspirons) in favor of completely new and original chassis designs. Some of its hardware and components continued to be shared with other Dell laptops, however.

In recent years, several Dell Vostro laptops share the same chassis with Inspiron laptops. For example, the Inspiron 14 5000 (5480) and Vostro 14 5000 (5481) uses the same chassis. This practice was not new; several other models prior to that have done a similar practice several years before it, where previous models such as the Inspiron 1400/1500/1700 and Vostro 1400/1500/1700 released in 2007 also shared the same chassis as well.

== Problems ==
=== Overheating ===
In 2003, Dell released several lines of Inspiron notebooks that had overheating issues. The systems would overheat and could cause damage to the microprocessor, video card, and motherboard. These systems would also randomly shut down due to overly-high internal temperatures. Overheating in these Inspiron systems is mainly caused by performance-consuming tasks and software. This problem was determined to be due to the design of the air-flow from the bottom of the system. It would draw in dirt/dust and clog the heat sink, making air unable to pass through in order to cool the system. Affected models include the Dell Inspiron 1100, 1150, 5100, 5150, and 5160. Also affected is the Latitude 100L, a near-clone of these models.

Dell acknowledged this problem and designed a new fan with a better heatsink and heatpipes to provide better cooling with less noise. Any repairs made at this point will include the redesigned parts.

On September 20, Inspiron 5150 owners in the US brought a class action against Dell. The settlement included 100% cash reimbursement for certain repairs, and an extended limited warranty to cover those types of repairs that become necessary for one year.

Following the lawsuit detailed above, in October 2006 customers who had purchased Dell Inspiron 1100, 1150, 5100, 5150, and 5160 notebooks filed a class action lawsuit against Dell, alleging misconduct in connection with the design, manufacture, warranting, advertising and selling of these computers. A similar action started in Canada.

Overheating has been reduced by using compressed air duster spray. Spraying the keyboard, the Microprocessor Thermal-Cooling Assembly located under the "I" - "backspace" keys, rear air vent/exhaust, bottom air intake, and side air vent (all located on the right side of affected systems) have been effective in reducing the running temperature from a normal operating temperature of 77-87 °C to 45-55 °C under average load.

Alternately, some users of these affected models found relief by underclocking their processors.

=== Motherboard failures ===
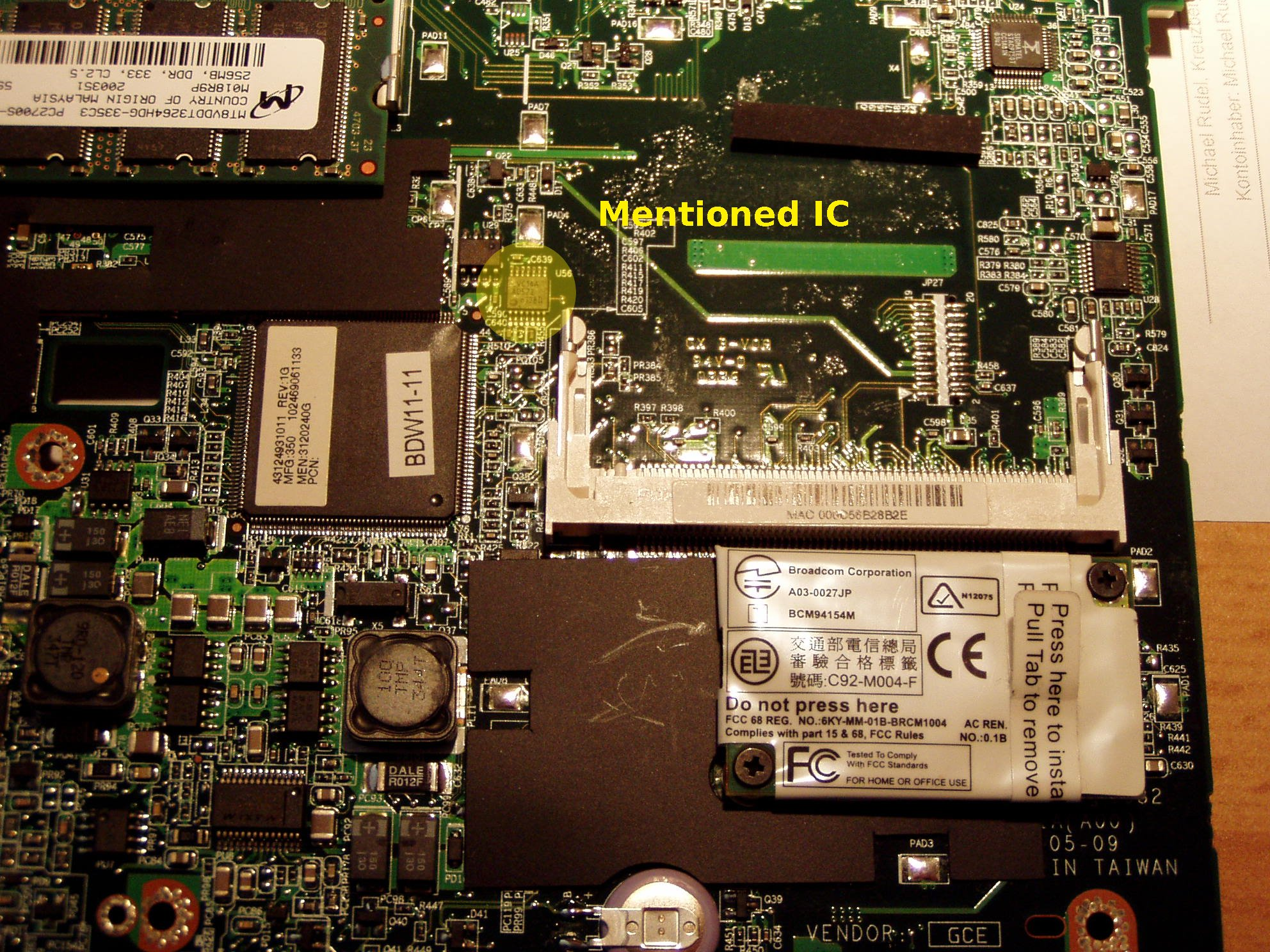

On a number of Inspiron 5150 and Latitude 100L systems, a design flaw in the positioning of a tab on the C panel on the underside of the laptop has led to problems. Any pressure applied to the top left-hand corner of the laptop causes this tab to press against the motherboard and in particular against the "LVC14A" chip. This causes the solder between this chip and the motherboard to break. This causes sudden shut-downs of the system as a result of any movement of the laptop; in certain cases the laptop will not re-boot at all. Dell has redesigned later models of the 5150 to avoid this problem. Some models reveal cases where someone has manually snapped off the tab from the C panel by hand during the manufacturing process. Dell currently covers this fault in the United States under the Lundell Settlement, although it is not known whether Dell will fix this fault free of charge outside the USA. In January 2007 a similar lawsuit started in Canada, and Dell in the Netherlands has agreed to repair Dutch computers following criticism in the consumer programme Kassa.

This has also been a problem with the Inspiron 1150, with the same chip giving problems with broken solder. Re-soldering is not recommended. Re-heating the pins can re-establish the connection and solve the power-off problem at the expense of possibly losing the use of the touch-pad mouse.

=== Battery recall of 2006 ===
Dell posted notices to many of their laptop customers on August 14, 2006, saying that the sanyo batteries on the following models could combust, or even explode:

Models Affected

Latitude	D410, D500, D505, D510, D520, D600, D610, D620, D630, D800, D810
Inspiron	6000, 6400, 8500, 8600, 9100, 9200, 9300, 500m, 510m, 600m, 6400, E1505, 700m, 710m, 9400, E1705
XPS	XPS, XPS Gen2, XPS M170, XPS M1710
Precision	M20, M60, M70, M90

Users of many of these computers purchased between April 2004 and July 18, 2006 received the recommendation that they should remove the batteries and run their computers on AC power until replacements arrived. Problematic batteries made by Sony led to recall programs at other laptop computer companies as well, including Hitachi, Toshiba, Lenovo (IBM) and Apple.

=== Power supply issues ===
Most Dell laptop computers have a special external power supply (PSU) which cannot be replaced by a third-party universal supply. The PSU has what's called UniqueWare™ Add-Only Memory, known under type DS2501. It is a parasitic power circuit memory chip connected to the center identification pin in the plug, via a 2m long unshielded wire alongside the PSU cable. This chip produces a special signal using a 1 wire communication protocol known as "1-wire" in identifying the PSU as an original Dell PSU. This chip handles all the data needed to authenticate a charge. If a power supply not made by Dell is used, or the cable near the connector becomes damaged as is not infrequent after some use, the PSU stops charging the battery and the CPU runs slower, although the computer can be used indefinitely so long as it remains plugged in. If this problem is present at startup, the message "The AC power adapter type cannot be determined. Your system will operate slower and the battery will not charge" is displayed. This will continue until the external PSU is replaced. A few third-party suppliers make power supplies with specific provision for Dell computers at lower prices than Dell's. It is possible to work round the slowdown, but not the battery charging, by installing a CPU clock utility. On some models (the 9100 for instance), the problem can be worked around by starting the computer without a battery installed and fitting the battery after the computer has booted.

Another problem arises after much use with the motherboard power connector; flap-like metal parts which contact the outside of the plug lose their tension and fail to make contact so that power does not reach the computer. The "official" solution is to replace the connector on the motherboard, which requires partial dis-assembly of the computer and desoldering a part with several pins; many companies charge a considerable sum for the work involved. Various simple alternatives have been suggested; for example a thin "skin" of solder on the outside of the barrel of the connector on the PSU (with care not to overheat the connector's plastic parts; and this thickened connector should not be used with other, not faulty Dell laptops, as it will stretch the springs and damage or even overheat the plug and socket assembly, causing them to melt or bond permanently).

One other problem can happen with the wattage rating of the power supply. There are two Dell power supplies that were used for different Inspiron models which have the same plug assembly and voltage, a 65-watt supply model PA-6 and a 90 watt supply model PA-9. Some models (for example the Inspiron 1100) shipped with a PA-9. If a PA-6 (or equivalent aftermarket supply) is used in these models then the system might not boot at times. In such cases, it will light the battery light for a few seconds when the supply is plugged in. This can also happen if the power supply becomes marginal. Marginal supplies can show as supplying full voltage even if tested with a voltmeter while the supply is plugged into the computer and an attempt is made to turn on the computer.

These problems are discussed in detail, and solutions and workarounds suggested, in a discussion on Tom's hardware site, and on The Laptop Junction site.

=== Hibernation sensor problem ===
A problem exists with the hibernation sensor located in some older laptops. Unlike many laptops that use a mechanical switch to detect when the lid is closed, in these systems the sensor is a magnetic reed switch that is located between the touchpad and the front edge of the laptop. There is a magnet that is located in the top lid above this switch, and when the lid is closed the magnet triggers the reed switch. If the magnet loses strength then the system will not go into suspend or hibernation if the lid is closed. The magnet strength can be checked by running a paper clip along the top edge of the screen. A worse problem happens if the reed switch fails. Sometimes the switches will fail in a closed position with the contacts sticking together. In that case the system will not switch on. There are several ways to check for this. First the laptop can be partially disassembled and the mouse assembly can be unplugged from the system board and the system switched on. If the system boots with the mouse unplugged then it is the switch. Another way to check for the problem is by running a magnet over the reed switch, there should be a faint click when the magnet triggers the switch. This does not require disassembly but the magnet must be in the correct position and be strong enough. Some people have modified the circuitry of the laptop by cutting the switch off of the assembly, with the downside being the system will no longer suspend if the lid is closed.

=== Vertical line LCD problem ===
Some 17" Inspiron 8600, 9200, 9300, 6000, 1750, and XPS Gen 2 notebook LCDs have a vertical line manufacturing defect. Symptoms range from individual lines to entire bars of the screen with inverted colors. Most problems showed after 2–4 years of usage.

Dell has been very reluctant to replace these panels after guarantee, although there was a direct link to the defective parts from their suppliers. Even warranty customers have had difficulty getting replacements, and replaced screens often develop the defect after a short time.

=== LCD Hinge Detachment problem ===
In some Inspiron laptops an issue exists where a hinge holding the LCD screen may, as a result of the forces resulting from the large screen, rip its plastic standoffs holding it from the chassis. This issue seems to be prevalent on the Inspiron 15-7559 and 15-5547 models.
