= Series 17 =

Series 17 or Season 17 may refer to:

- Lego Minifigures (theme)#Series 17, the toy line by Lego
- Roland TD-17 Series, a Drum Sound Module by Roland Corporation
- 17" series laptops
  - Alienware 17
  - Dell Inspiron 17
  - LG Gram 17

== See also ==
- System 17

Preceded by Series 16	Series 17	Succeeded by Series 18
