= Atomic semantics =

Atomic semantics is a type of guarantee provided by a data register shared by several processors in a parallel machine or in a network of computers working together. Atomic semantics are very strong. An atomic register provides strong guarantees even when there is concurrency and failures.

A read/write register R stores a value and is accessed by two basic operations: read and write(v). A read returns the value stored in R and write(v) changes the value stored in R to v. A register is called atomic if it satisfies the two following properties:

1) Each invocation op of a read or write operation:

•Must appear as if it were executed at a single point τ(op) in time.

•τ (op) works as follow: τb(op) ≤ τ (op) ≤ τe(op): where τb(op) and τe(op) indicate the time when the operation op begins and ends.

•If op1 ≠ op2, then τ (op1)≠τ (op2)

2) Each read operation returns the value written by the last write operation before the read, in the sequence where all operations are ordered by their τ values.

Atomic/Linearizable register:

Termination: when a node is correct, sooner or later each read and write operation will complete.

Safety Property (Linearization points for read and write and failed operations):

Read operation:It appears as if happened at all nodes at some times between the invocation and response time.

Write operation: Similar to read operation, it appears as if happened at all nodes at some times between the invocation and response time.

Failed operation(The atomic term comes from this notion):It appears as if it is completed at every single node or it never happened at any node.

Example : We know that an atomic register is one that is linearizable to a sequential safe register.

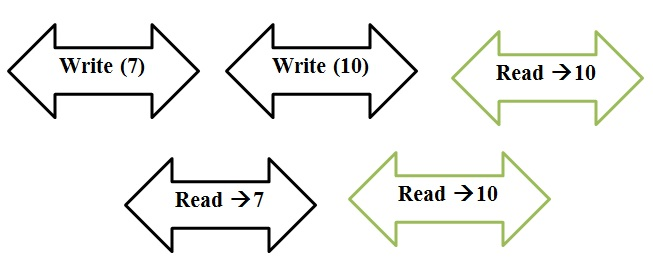
atomic

The following picture shows where we should put the linearization point for each operation:

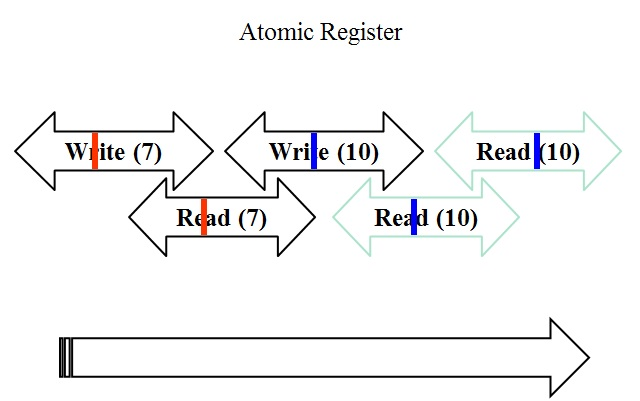
Atomic register

An atomic register could be defined for a variable with a single writer but multi- readers (SWMR), single-writer/single-reader (SWSR), or multi-writer/multi-reader (MWMR). Here is an example of a multi-reader multi-writer atomic register which is accessed by three processes (P1, P2, P3). Note that R. read() → v means that the corresponding read operation returns v, which is the value of the register. Therefore, the following execution of the register R could satisfies the definition of the atomic registers: R.write(1), R.read()→1, R.write(3), R.write(2), R.read()→2, R.read()→2.

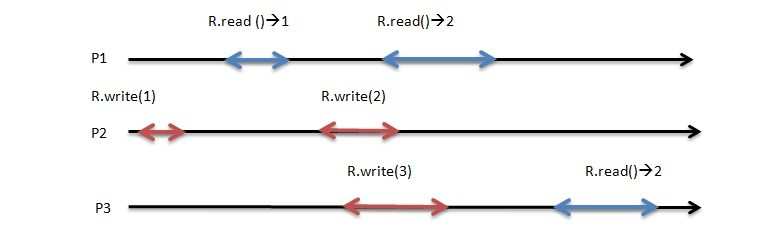
Atomic MWMR1

== See also ==
- Regular semantics
- Safe semantics
