= Dynamic video memory technology =

Dynamic video memory technology (DVMT) is an Intel technology allowing dynamic allocation of system memory for use as video memory, giving more resources for 2D/3D graphics.

== How it works ==
The amount of video memory is dependent upon the amount of pre-allocated video memory plus DVMT allocation. DVMT, as its name implies, dynamically allocates system memory for use as video memory to ensure more available resources for 2D/3D graphics performance, e.g. for graphically demanding games.

On actual implementations, the DVMT Fixed Memory is allocated and controlled by the BIOS; the DVMT Dynamic Memory is allocated and controlled by the operating system and the driver, but the BIOS can decide the maximum size of DVMT Dynamic Memory.

== See also ==
- HyperMemory
- TurboCache
