= Nano-threads =

In computer science nano-threads are highly optimized lightweight threads designed for use on shared memory multiprocessors (such as SMPs). The Nano-threads specification was written in 1997.
