= Delta consistency =

Delta consistency is one of the consistency models used in the domain of parallel programming, for example in distributed shared memory, distributed transactions, and Optimistic replication

The delta consistency model states that an update will propagate through the system and all replicas will be consistent after a fixed time period δ. In other words, the result of any read operation is consistent with a read on the original copy of an object except for a (short) bounded interval after a modification. So basically, if you have an object which is modified, during the short period of time following its modification, the read will not be consistent. Then, after a fixed time period, the modification is propagated and the read will be consistent.

== Sources ==
- Communication Systems: The State of the Art : IFIP 17th World Computer Congress, Lyman Chapin ed. 2002
