= EAFP =

EAFP may refer to:

- It is easier to ask forgiveness than it is to get permission
  - In programming, it refers to a practice of performing a possibly illegal operation without checking first whether this operation would succeed, and then handling the possible error, instead of checking ahead of time. EAFP reduces the risk of time of check to time of use errors which can occur when checking first (often known as LBYL, Look Before You Leap). In particular, EAFP is encouraged in the Python programming language.
- European Association of Faculties of Pharmacy; See Faculty of Pharmacy, University of Lisbon

== See also ==
- European Academy of Facial Plastic Surgery (EAFPS); See Alexander Berghaus
