= Memory semantics (computing) =

Process logic used to control access to shared memory locations

In computing and parallel processing, memory semantics refers to the process logic used to control access to shared memory locations, or at a higher level to shared variables in the presence of multiple threads or processors.

Memory semantics may also be defined for transactional memory, where issues related to the interaction of transactions and locks, and user-level actions need to be defined and specified.

== See also ==
- Consistency model
