= Vector-field consistency =

Vector-Field Consistency (Note: _{Designation coined by L. Veiga.}) is a consistency model for replicated data (for example, objects), initially described in a paper which was awarded the best-paper prize in the ACM/IFIP/Usenix Middleware Conference 2007. It has since been enhanced for increased scalability and fault-tolerance in a recent paper.

== Description ==
This consistency model was initially designed for replicated data management in ad hoc gaming in order to minimize bandwidth usage without sacrificing playability. Intuitively, it captures the notion that although players require, wish, and take advantage of information regarding the whole of the game world (as opposed to a restricted view to rooms, arenas, etc. of limited size employed in many multiplayer video games), they need to know information with greater freshness, frequency, and accuracy as other game entities are located closer and closer to the player's position.

It prescribes a multidimensional divergence bounding scheme, based on a vector field that employs consistency vectors k=(θ,σ,ν), standing for maximum allowed time - or replica staleness, sequence - or missing updates, and value (Note: _{Since in the Greek alphabet there was no letter for the vee sound, the nu letter was preferred for its resemblance with the roman V, for value, instead of β (beta) for the vee sound in contemporary Greek speaking.}) - or user-defined measured replica divergence, applied to all space coordinates in game scenario or world.

The consistency vector-fields emanate from field-generators designated as pivots (for example, players) and field intensity attenuates as distance grows from these pivots in concentric or square-like regions. This consistency model unifies locality-awareness techniques employed in message routing and consistency enforcement for multiplayer games, with divergence bounding techniques traditionally employed in replicated database and web scenarios.
