= PRAM consistency =

PRAM consistency (pipelined random access memory) also known as FIFO consistency.

All processes see memory writes from one process in the order they were issued from the process.

Writes from different processes may be seen in a different order on different processes. Only the write order needs to be consistent, thus the name pipelined. PRAM consistency is easy to implement. In effect it says that there are no guarantees about the order in which different processes see writes, except that two or more writes from a single source must arrive in order, as though they were in a pipeline.

  P1:W(x)1 
  P2:       R(x)1W(x)2
  P3:                  R(x)1R(x)2
  P4:                  R(x)2R(x)1
  Time ---->

Fig: A valid sequence of events for PRAM consistency.

The above sequence is not valid for Causal consistency because W(x)1 and W(x)2 are causal, so different processes must read it in the same sequence.
