= Racetrack problem =

Flaw in a system or process due to recursive dependence

A racetrack problem is a specific instance of a type of race condition. A racetrack problem is a flaw in a system or process whereby the output and/or result of the process is unexpectedly and critically dependent on the sequence or timing of other events that run in a circular pattern. This problem is semantically different from a race condition due to the circular nature of the problem.

The term originates with the idea of two signals racing each other in a circular motion to influence the output first. Racetrack problems can occur in electronics systems, especially logic circuits, and in computer software, especially multithreaded or distributed programs.

== See also ==
- Concurrency control
- Deadlock
- Synchronization
- Therac-25
