= Red Hat Cluster Suite =

High-availability cluster software

The Red Hat Cluster Suite (RHCS) includes software to create a high availability and load balancing cluster. Both can be used on the same system although this use case is unlikely. Both products, the High Availability Add-On and Load Balancer Add-On, are based on open-source community projects. Red Hat Cluster developers contribute code upstream for the community. Computational clustering is not part of cluster suite, but instead provided by Red Hat MRG.

== High-Availability Add-On ==
The High Availability Add-On is Red Hat's implementation of Linux-HA. It attempts to ensure service availability by monitoring other nodes of the cluster. All nodes of the cluster must agree on their configuration and shared services state before the cluster is considered to have a quorum and services are able to be started.

The primary form of communicating node status is via a network device (commonly Ethernet), although in the case of possible network failure, quorum can be decided through secondary methods such as shared storage or multicast.

Software services, filesystems and network status can be monitored and controlled by the cluster suite, services and resources can be failed over to other network nodes in case of failure.

The Cluster forcibly terminates a cluster node's access to services or resources, via fencing, to ensure the node and data is in a known state. The node is terminated by removing power (known as STONITH) or access to the shared storage. More recent versions of Red Hat use a distributed lock manager, to allow fine grained locking and no single point of failure. Earlier versions of the cluster suite relied on a "grand unified lock manager" (GULM) which could be clustered, but still presented a point of failure if the nodes acting as GULM servers were to fail. GULM was last available in Red Hat Cluster Suite 4.

=== Technical details ===
- Support for up to 128 nodes (16 nodes on Red Hat Enterprise Linux 3, 4, 5, and 6)
- NFS (Unix) /SMB /GFS /GFS2 (Multiple Operating systems) File system failover support
- Service failover support
- Fully shared storage subsystem
- Comprehensive data integrity
- SCSI and fibre channel support
- OCF and LSM resource agents

== Load Balancing Add-On ==
Red Hat adapted the Piranha load balancing software to allow for transparent load balancing and failover between servers. The application being balanced does not require special configuration to be balanced, instead a Red Hat Enterprise Linux server with the load balancer configured, intercepts and routes traffic based on metrics/rules set on the load balancer.

== Support and Product Life-Cycle ==
Red Hat cluster suite support is tied to a matching version of Red Hat Enterprise Linux and follows the same maintenance policy. The product has no activation, time limit or remote kill switch, it will remain working after the support life cycle has ended. It is partially supported running under VMware Virtual Machine.

== History ==
The cluster suite is available in:

- Red Hat Enterprise Linux 2.1 March 26, 2002; 23 years ago
- Red Hat Enterprise Linux 3.x, 4.x, 5.x - with supported Global File System (v1.x) as a filesystem
- Red Hat Enterprise Linux 5
  - Red Hat Enterprise Linux 5.3 and later - with Global File System 2
- Red Hat Enterprise Linux 6.0 and later, with Corosync (project), CMAN, and RGManager
  - Red Hat Enterprise Linux 6.5 and later, with Corosync (project), CMAN, and RGManager, or Pacemaker Resource Manager
- Red Hat Enterprise Linux 7.0 and later October 6, 2014; 10 years ago, with Corosync (project) and Pacemaker Resource Manager

== See also ==
- Global File System
- Logical Volume Manager (Linux)
