= SIOS LifeKeeper =

High-availability cluster software

- Initial release: 1992
- Operating system: Linux and Microsoft Windows
- Type: High-availability Clustering
- License: Proprietary
- Website: https://us.sios.com/products/sios-lifekeeper-linux/

SIOS LifeKeeper (formerly known as SteelEye LifeKeeper) is a high-availability cluster software, for Linux computer systems. It provides application cluster capabilities for nonstop operation and disaster recovery to systems running databases, file sharing on a network, electronic commerce websites, ERP systems or other applications requiring nonstop operation

It was originally designed and developed by AT&T Bell Labs in 1992 to ensure high availability of their worldwide voice network system running on Unix-based Star Servers. After AT&T divested the LifeKeeper division to NCR, SteelEye acquired the technology in 1999. SteelEye was later renamed SIOS Technology Corp. in 2006, after being acquired by SIOS Technology, Inc.

== Description ==
High availability clusters (HAC) improve application availability by failing them over or switching them over in a group of systems—as opposed to High Performance Clusters, which improve application performance by running them on multiple systems simultaneously. SIOS LifeKeeper provides continuous monitoring of the entire application stack and will recover a service or application locally or on another cluster node at the same site or another geographic location. It supports all major Linux distributions and accommodates a wide range of storage architecture. SIOS clustering software synchronizes local storage on all cluster nodes creating a cluster in a cloud where shared storage is not available. SIOS LifeKeeper is SAP-certified for SAP NetWeaver and SAP S/4HANA to monitor the critical services and automatically apply SAP best practices for nonstop operation of critical SAP environments.

Similar products include Fujitsu PRIMECLUSTER, IBM HACMP, HP ServiceGuard, IBM Tivoli System Automation for Multiplatforms (SA MP), Linux-HA, Microsoft Cluster Server (MSCS), NEC ExpressCluster, Red Hat Cluster Suite, Veritas Cluster Server and Sun Cluster.

In 2009, the company launched a program enabling users of HP ServiceGuard, which HP stopped selling that year, to migrate to the LifeKeeper for Linux product. LifeKeeper has won the Best Clustering Solution Award at LinuxWorld on several occasions.

== See also ==
- High-availability cluster
- Sun Cluster
- Computer cluster
