= Corosync Cluster Engine =

Group communication system

- Developer: The Corosync Development Community
- Initial release: 2008; 18 years ago
- Stable release: 3.1.10 () / 15 November 2025
- Written in: C
- Operating system: Cross-platform
- Type: Group Communication System
- License: New BSD License
- Website: corosync.github.io
- Repository: github.com/corosync/corosync

The Corosync Cluster Engine is an open source implementation of the Totem Single Ring Ordering and Membership protocol. It was originally derived from the OpenAIS project and licensed under the new BSD License. The mission of the Corosync effort is to develop, release, and support a community-defined, open source cluster.

== Features ==
The Corosync Cluster Engine is a group communication system with additional features for implementing high availability within applications.

The project provides four C application programming interface (API) features:

- A closed process group communication model with virtual synchrony guarantees for creating replicated state machines.
- A simple availability manager that restarts the application process when it has failed.
- A configuration and statistics in-memory database that provides the ability to set, retrieve, and receive change notifications of information.
- A quorum system that notifies applications when quorum is achieved or lost.

The software is designed to operate on UDP/IP and InfiniBand networks.

== Architecture ==
The software is composed of an executive binary which uses a client-server communication model between libraries and service engines. Loadable modules, called service engines, are loaded into the Corosync Cluster Engine and use the services provided by the Corosync Service Engine internal API.

The services provided by the Corosync Service Engine internal API are:

- An implementation of the Totem Single Ring Ordering and Membership protocol providing the Extended Virtual Synchrony model for messaging and membership.
- The coroipc high performance shared memory IPC system.
- An object database that implements the in memory database model.
- Systems to route IPC and Totem messages to the correct service engines.

Additionally Corosync provides several default service engines that are used via C APIs:

- cpg - Closed Process Group
- sam - Simple Availability Manager
- confdb - Configuration and Statistics database
- quorum - Provides notifications of gain or loss of quorum

== History ==
The project was formally announced in July 2008 via a conference paper at the Ottawa Linux Symposium. The source code of OpenAIS was refactored such that the core infrastructure components were placed into Corosync and the SA Forum APIs were kept in OpenAIS.

In the second version of corosync, published in 2012, quorum subsystem was changed and integrated into the daemon. This version is available since Fedora 17 and RHEL7.

Flatiron branch (1.4.x) development ended with 1.4.10 release. Needle branch was announced stable with 2.0.0 release on 10 April 2012. Development of this branch stopped with 2.4.6 release on 9 November 2022, because 3.x branch (Camelback) was considered to be stable after almost 4 years of work.

== See also ==
- Linux-HA
- Pacemaker (software)
