= Pacemaker (software) =

Open source high availability resource manager software

- Initial release: 2004
- Stable release: 3.0.1 / 7 August 2025; 4 months ago
- Repository: github.com/ClusterLabs/pacemaker
- Written in: C
- Operating system: Cross-platform
- Type: Group communication system
- License: GNU General Public License Version 2
- Website: www.clusterlabs.org/pacemaker/

Pacemaker is an open-source high availability resource manager software used on computer clusters since 2004. Until about 2007, it was part of the Linux-HA project, then was split out to be its own project.

It implements several APIs for controlling resources, but its preferred API for this purpose is the Open Cluster Framework resource agent API.

== Related software ==
Pacemaker is generally used with Corosync Cluster engine or Linux-HA Heartbeat.

== See also ==
- High-availability cluster
- Red Hat cluster suite
