= SIOS Technology Corp. =

- Type: Privately Held
- Founded: 1999; 27 years ago in Lexington, South Carolina, United States
- Founders: Jim Fitzgerald, Sue Ellery and Jim Mason
- Headquarters: San Mateo, California
- Products: High Availability Cluster Software
- Website: us.sios.com

SIOS Technology Corp. is a San Mateo, California–based company focused on IT operations analytics ITOA, cloud computing, business continuity and disaster recovery for large enterprises. It is based in Tokyo, Japan, and primarily assists large enterprises in adopting open, cloud computing technology.

== History ==
SIOS Technology Inc. was founded in May 1997 in Japan and has led the development of open source software and Web application software. Given its open source software experience, the company pushed for the early adoption of Linux products in Japan. SIOS Technology Inc. provides SAN and SAN Less software products that protect applications from downtime and data loss in any combination of physical, virtual, and cloud.

Steeleye Technology was founded in December 1999 by Jim Fitzgerald, Sue Ellery and Jim Mason. The company acquired the LifeKeeper high-availability clustering software from NCR Corporation that year, and began targeting the fledgling Linux server community with the product in January 2000.

AT&T’s Bell Labs created the LifeKeeper platform in the mid-1990s for high-availability of AT&T's Star Unix servers that operated the telecom company's phone switching technology. NCR took control of the LifeKeeper portfolio when AT&T spun off the company in 1997.

The business focuses on software products that provide high availability and disaster protection for business critical applications.

In 2003, the company introduced Life Keeper for Windows 2003. In 2008, the company announced Data Keeper data replication. The company expanded its presence into virtual environments with the introduction of business continuity for VMware in 2007 Citrix and Microsoft's Hyper-V in 2008.

In 2015, SIOS introduced a machine-learning based IT operations analytics platform for VMware environments.

On December 5, 2017, SIOS partnered with VSTECS Holdings Ltd. a technology product and supply chain services platform in the Asia-Pacific (APAC) region. The partnership enables VSTECs to provide comprehensive professional services and SAN less high availability clustering software to AWS customers throughout APAC.

== See also ==
- Virtual machine
- Disaster recovery
- IT operations analytics
