= Log shipping =

Log shipping is the process of automating the backup of transaction log files on a primary (production) database server, and then restoring them onto a standby server. This technique is supported by Microsoft SQL Server, 4D Server, MySQL, and PostgreSQL. Similar to replication, the primary purpose of log shipping is to increase database availability by maintaining a backup server that can replace a production server quickly. Other databases such as Adaptive Server Enterprise and Oracle Database support the technique but require the Database Administrator to write code or scripts to perform the work.

Although the actual failover mechanism in log shipping is manual, this implementation is often chosen due to its low cost in human and server resources, and ease of implementation. In comparison, SQL server clusters enable automatic failover, but at the expense of much higher storage costs. Compared to database replication, log shipping does not provide as much in terms of reporting capabilities, but backs up system tables along with data tables, and locks the standby server from users' modifications. A replicated server can be modified (e.g. views) and is therefore unsuitable for failover purposes.
