= OCF =

OCF may refer to:

- Ocala International Airport, in Ocala, Florida
- Off Center Fed antenna, a dipole antenna with specific placement of feedpoint allowing multiple resonances in HF band
- Officers' Christian Fellowship, a nonprofit Christian parachurch organization that serves the U.S. military
- Open channel flow, flow of a fluid with its surface exposed to the atmosphere
- Open Cluster Framework, a clustering standard in computing
- Open Computing Facility, at University of California, Berkeley
- Open Connectivity Foundation, the largest industrial connectivity standard organization for IoT
- Open Container Format (also OEBPS Container Format), a specification for ebooks in the ePUB format
- OpenBSD Cryptographic Framework, an OpenBSD initiative to provide operating-system support for cryptographic-acceleration hardware
- Operating cash flow, a term in financial accounting
- Optimum Coding in the Frequency Domain
- Ordinal collapsing function, a process used for reaching large ordinals in the field of set theory
- Ordnance Clothing Factory, Avadi, Shahjahanpur, India
- Oregon Country Fair, an annual event in Veneta, Oregon
- Original Composite Font, an early CJK font format by Adobe Systems
- Orthodox Christian Fellowship, a North American Orthodox campus ministry
- Our Common Future, a 1987 report from the United Nations World Commission on Environment and Development (WCED)
- Owens Corning Fiberglass, a manufacturer of fiberglass insulation
- Observable canonical form
