= Sistina =

Sistina may refer to:

- Sistina (typeface), an all-capitals serif typeface
- Sistina Software, a U.S. company that focused on storage solutions designed around a Linux platform, acquired by Red Hat in 2003
- Sistine Chapel (Cappella Sistina in Italian)
