= PlayStation 3 cluster =

Supercomputer platform

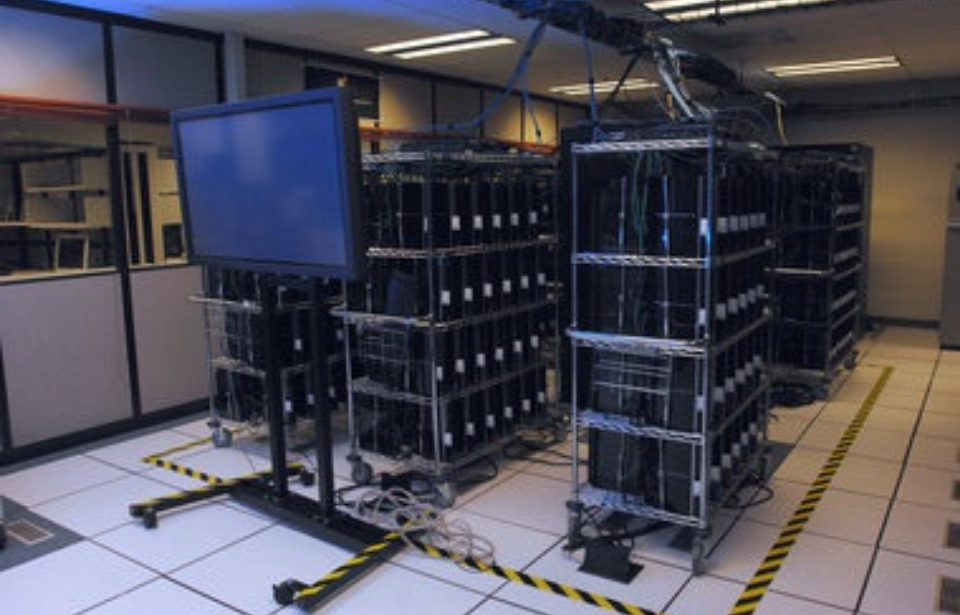
The Condor Cluster, a supercomputer composed of many PS3s, built by the US Department of Defense in 2010

A PlayStation 3 cluster is a distributed system computer composed mainly of PlayStation 3 home video game consoles.

Before and during the console's production lifetime, its powerful IBM Cell CPU attracted interest in using multiple, networked PS3s for affordable high-performance computing.

== Deployments ==
PlayStation 3 clusters have had different configurations. A distributed computing system utilizing PlayStation 3 consoles does not need to meet the strict definition of a computer cluster.

By November 2003, the National Center for Supercomputing Applications had already built a cluster based on the PlayStation 2. Terra Soft Solutions released Yellow Dog Linux for the PlayStation 3, and sold PS3s with it pre-installed, in single units and in 8 and 32 node clusters. RapidMind developed a stream programming package for the PS3.

On January 3, 2007, Dr. Frank Mueller, Professor of Computer Science at North Carolina State University, clustered 8 PS3s. Mueller commented that the 256 MB of system RAM is a limitation for this particular application, and considered attempting to retrofit more RAM. Software includes Fedora Core 5 Linux ppc64, MPICH2, OpenMP v2.5, GNU Compiler Collection, and CellSDK 1.1.

In mid-2007, Gaurav Khanna, a professor in the Physics Department of the University of Massachusetts Dartmouth independently built a message-passing based cluster using eight PS3s running Fedora Linux, named the PS3 Gravity Grid. It was built with support from Sony Computer Entertainment as the first PS3 cluster with published scientific results. It performed astrophysical simulations of large supermassive black holes capturing smaller compact objects. Khanna claims that its performance exceeds that of a 100+ Intel Xeon core based traditional Linux cluster, on his simulations. The PS3 Gravity Grid gathered significant media attention from 2007 through 2010. Khanna also created an instructional website on building such clusters.

In May 2008, The Laboratory for Cryptological Algorithms, under the direction of Arjen Lenstra at École Polytechnique Fédérale de Lausanne, built a cluster of 200 consoles which broke a record for the Diffie-Hellman problem on elliptic curves. The cluster operated until 2015.

In November 2010, the Air Force Research Laboratory created a powerful supercomputer, nicknamed the "Condor Cluster", by connecting together 1,760 processors with 168 GPUs and 84 coordinating servers in a parallel array capable of 500 trillion floating-point operations per second (500 TFLOPS). As built, the Condor Cluster was the 33rd largest supercomputer in the world and was used to analyze high definition satellite imagery at a cost of only one tenth that of a traditional supercomputer. The Condor was also used to research Artificial Intelligence, Neuromorphic computing and Pattern Recognition.

=== Single PS3 ===
Even a single PS3 can significantly accelerate some computations. Marc Stevens, Arjen K. Lenstra, and Benne de Weger have demonstrated an MD5 brute-force attack in a few hours. In November 2007, they said: "Essentially, a single PlayStation 3 performs like a cluster of 30 PCs at the price of only one".

=== Medical research ===
On March 22, 2007, SCE and Stanford University expanded the Folding@home project to the PS3. Along with thousands of PCs already joined over the Internet, PS3 owners contributed to the study of improper protein folding and associated diseases, such as Alzheimer's, Parkinson's, Huntington's, cystic fibrosis, and cancer. The software was included as part of the 1.6 firmware update on March 22, 2007, and can be set to run manually or automatically when the PS3 is idle through the XrossMediaBar. Processing power from PS3 users greatly contributed, ranked third to Nvidia and AMD GPUs in teraflops. In March 2011, more than one million PS3s had Folding@home installed and more than 27,000 active, for a total of 8.1 petaFLOPS. By comparison, the world's most powerful supercomputer as of November 2010, the Tianhe-IA, has a peak performance of 2.56 petaFLOPS, or 2,566 teraFLOPS.

The Computational Biochemistry and Biophysics Lab in Barcelona launched a distributed computing project called PS3GRID. This project was expected to run sixteen times faster than on a PC.

eHiTS Lightning is the first virtual screening and molecular docking software for the PS3. It was released by SimBioSys. as reported by Bio-IT World in July 2008. This application runs up to 30 times faster on a single PS3 than on a regular single CPU PC, and it runs on PS3 clusters, achieving screening of huge chemical compound libraries in hours or days rather than weeks.

== Decline ==
On March 28, 2010, Sony announced it would be disabling the PS3's OtherOS feature, with the v3.21 update, due to security concerns. This update would not affect any existing supercomputing clusters, because they are not connected to PlayStation Network and would not be forced to update. However, it would make replacing the individual consoles that compose the clusters very difficult or impossible, because newer models would be shipped with v3.21. This caused the end of the PS3's common use for clustered computing, though projects like "The Condor" were still being created with older PS3 units, and have come online after that update.

== See also ==
- Beowulf cluster
- General-purpose computing on graphics processing units
