= Open Cluster Framework =

Clustering standard in computing

Open Cluster Framework (OCF) is a set of standards for computer clustering.

The project started as a working group of the Free Standards Group, now part of the Linux Foundation. Original supporters included several computing companies and groups, including Compaq, Conectiva, IBM, Linux-HA, MSC Software, the Open Source Development Lab, OSCAR, Red Hat, SGI and SUSE.

OCF Resource agents are currently supported by Linux-HA Heartbeat, the high-availability cluster software.
