= DEGIMA =

High performance computer cluster

The DEGIMA (DEstination for Gpu Intensive MAchine) is a high performance computer cluster used for hierarchical N-body simulations at the Nagasaki Advanced Computing Center, Nagasaki University.

The system consists of a 144-node cluster of PCs connected via an InfiniBand interconnect. Each node is composed of 2.66 GHz Intel Core i7 920 processor, two GeForce GTX295 graphics cards, 12 GB DDR3-1333 memory and Mellanox MHES14-XTC SDR InfiniBand host adapter on MSI X58 pro-E motherboard. Each graphics card has two GT200 GPU chips. As a whole, the system has 144 CPUs and 576 GPUs. It runs astrophysical N-body simulations with over 3,000,000,000 particles using the Multiple-Walk parallel treecode. The system is noted for being highly cost and energy-efficient, having a peak performance of 111 TFLOPS with an energy efficiency of 1376 MFLOPS/watt. The overall cost of the hardware was approximately US$500,000.

The name of the system is also derived from the name of a small artificial island called "Dejima" in Nagasaki.

== See also ==
- Supercomputing in Japan
- Beowulf cluster
