= Close-coupled cooling =

Cooling system used in data centers

Close-coupled cooling is an advanced cooling system particularly used in data centers. The goal of close-coupled cooling is to bring heat transfer as close to the source of heat as possible. Moving the air conditioner closer to the equipment rack, it ensures a more immediate capture of exhaust air and that the cool air goes exactly where it is needed.

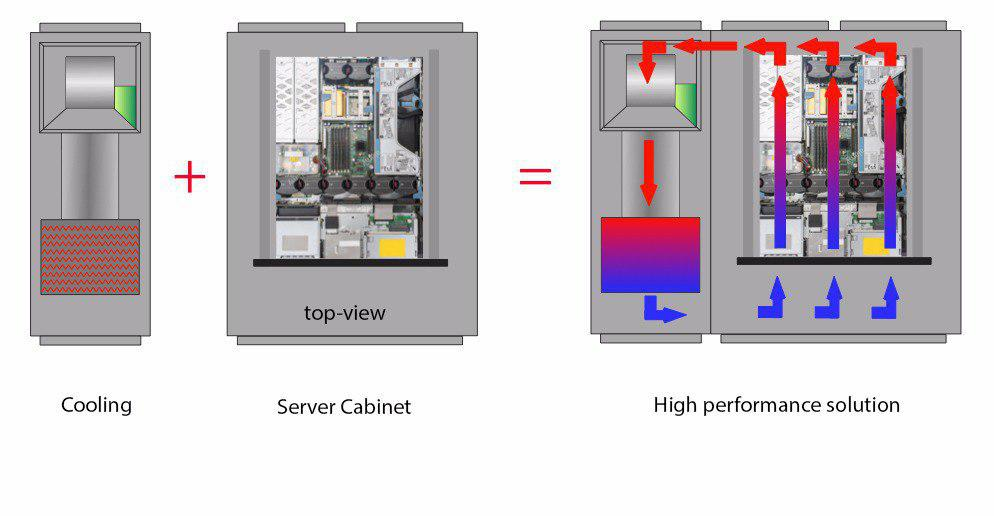
The proximity of the cooling system with the server cabinet allows a high-performance solution

== Air conditioner types ==
Commercially available close-coupled solutions can be divided into two categories: open-loop and closed-loop.

=== Open-loop configuration ===
Open-loop configurations are not totally independent of the room in which they are installed, and air flows interact with the surrounding conditions of the room.

==== In-row air conditioners ====
Row-based air conditioning units are installed inside the rack's rows. Air flows generally follow short and linear paths, reducing the necessary power needed to start up the fans, therefore increasing energy efficiency.

A row-based cooling solution can be better than a single cooling system for the room, since it can be better adapted to the needs of cooling for specific rows.

==== Rear door heat exchangers ====
A rear door heat exchanger type of solution substitutes the rear door of an existing rack with a heat exchange system.

These heat exchangers leverage the front-to-back pattern of energy loss present in most of the IT equipment: the servers dissipate warm air, which passes the heat exchanger coil and is returned to the room at a cooler temperature.

Because these cooling units do not take up additional space, they are particularly suitable either to cool all the spaces originally designed as data centers, or as a way to integrate an already existing cooling system.

==== Overhead heat exchangers ====
Generally, a heat exchanger takes air from the ceiling into the cold aisle, and air vents in the ceiling follow air's natural flow; in close-coupled system cases, the units are positioned directly above the servers, making the cold air delivery and hot air return much more precise.

A system of this type, being positioned vertically, does not need floor space in the room.

=== Closed-loop configuration ===
The closed-loop cooling configurations act independently of the room in which they are installed; the rack and the heat exchanger work exclusively with one another, creating an internal microclimate.

==== In rack cooling ====
The cooling system is next to the server rack and both of them are completely sealed; the solid doors on the enclosure and in-row air conditioners contain the air flow, directing cold air to the server inlet, and exhaust air through the cooling coil by using fans.

The closed-loop design allows for very focused cooling at the rack level and it is possible to install very dense IT equipment disregarding the external environment, enabling flexibility to use unconventional spaces to install the equipment.

== Efficiency ==
In the traditional layout, the fans must move air from the perimeter of the room, under the raised floor, and through holes in the floor tile into servers intake. This process requires energy, which varies depending on the structure of the server. Often, under the raised floor, holdbacks (large cable bundles, conduits) exist, requiring additional fan energy to move the required cold air volume.

Because the cooling system and the equipment rack are close to one another in close-coupled solutions, the energy needed is reduced. With an in-row typology the cooling unit is integrated in the row of racks and, providing air directly to the row, there are no impediments to consider under the floor. It is estimated that when implemented, a close-coupled system can guarantee up to 95% of annual energy reduction compared to a traditional CRAC system of equal cooling capacity.

Some cooling typologies can be associated with fans that have a variable velocity that adapts better to the workload and the internal temperature of the rack. Having fans that work at the minimum velocity satisfying the requirements of the Data Center also helps reduce energy consumption.

It is verified that the percentage of energy saved increases in a more than proportional way with respect to the decrease of air flow (for example, by reducing the fan velocity by 10% we save 27% of energy).

% FLOW	HOURS	ANNUAL ENERGY	ANNUAL COST	RPM	SAVINGS
100	8760	49.774,43	1.742,10	2040	0%
95	8760	42.774,64	1.493,64	1938	14.26%
90	8760	36.285,56	1.269,99	1836	27.10%
85	8760	30.567,72	1.069,87	1734	38.59%
80	8760	25.484,51	891,96	1632	48.80%
75	8760	20.998,59	734,95	1530	57.81%
70	8760	17.072,63	697,01	1428	59.99%

Despite an expected explosive growth of sales of close-coupled solutions, more recent studies have shown a slower growth. The reason might be due to the fact that in-row solutions provide significant energy savings only if racks meet 8-10 kW threshold; today's average densities for medium-sized data centers are instead about 5 kW and energy savings do not fully justify the higher cost of investment for the cooling system.

=== Refrigerated Water Temperatures ===
In traditional systems, the refrigerated water supply temperatures typically vary between 6 and 7 °C and cold water is necessary to generate cold air, since the cold inlet air and the hot exhaust air interact. However, it is necessary to ensure that the inlet temperature is between 18 and 26.5 °C as established by the ASHRAE.

Some types of close-coupled systems allow warmer water inlet temperatures due to the proximity of the refrigeration system and the design of the cooling coil while remaining within the guidelines of the ASHRAE.

Since the refrigerators represent 30-40% of the energy consumption of a data center, and most of that energy consumption is because of mechanical refrigeration, a higher water inlet temperature allows increasing the hours in which free cooling is possible, therefore increasing the efficiency of the refrigerator.

== Google data centers ==
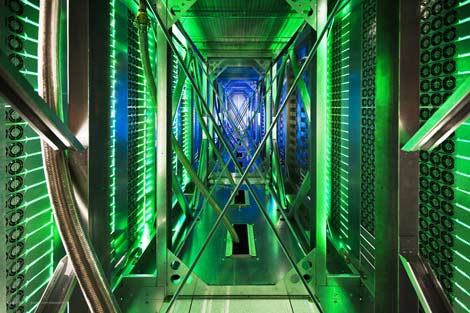
Google Data Center

In a 2016 interview, Google vice president of data centers Joseph Kava said that the company restructures the cooling system of its data centers every 12–18 months, and was focusing on close-coupled systems.

In the data centers, there is a raised floor but there are no perforated tiles. Cooling occurs in closed corridors with rows of racks on both sides while cooling coils using cold water serve as the ceiling of these warm corridors, and also house the pipes that carry the water to and from the cooling towers housed in another part of the building.

The temperature of the air is generally maintained around 26.5 °C, but steadily gets warmer, up to about 49 °C, due to contact with various components. When air is directed by fans in the warm closed corridor, reaching the top of the room passes through the cooling coil and is cooled to room temperature. The flexible piping then connects to the cooling coil at the top of the hot aisle, descends through an opening in the floor, and flows under the raised floor.

From the statements of Kava: "If we had leaks in the conduits, the water would sink down into our raised floor. We have a lot of experience with this design, and it has never happened a large water loss", the presence of an emergency system for any water leaks is confirmed. It is also confirmed that the proximity of liquids to the servers is not considered problematic.

Kava also stated, referring to other types of cooling systems with installations on the ceiling to return the hot exhaust air to the air conditioners of the computer room (CRAC) located along the perimeter of the raised floor area, that the "system is inefficient because the hot air is moved over a long distance while traveling towards the 'CRAC', while a close coupled system is significantly more efficient."

== Bibliography ==
- Bean, J., & Dunlap, K. (2008), Energy Efficient Data Centers: A Close-coupled Row Solution , ASHRAE Journal, 34–40.
- EPA. (2007, Agosto 2), EPA Report to Congress on Server and Data Center Energy Efficiency, da Energy Star.
- EYP Mission Critical Facilities. (2006, Luglio 26). Energy Intensive Buildings Trends and Solutions: Data Centers , da Critical Facilities Roundtable.
- Fontecchio, M. (2009, Gennaio 21), Data Center Air Conditioning Fans Blow Savings Your Way , da Search Data Center.
- Sun Microsystems (2008), Energy Efficient Data Centers: The Role of Modularity in Data Center Design, Sun Microsystems.

== Notes ==
- DataCenterKnowledge
- Cabling install
- Close-coupled cooling market
