= Sistina Software =

Sistina Software was a US company that focused on storage solutions designed around a Linux platform. It originated in the University of Minnesota.

Their three primary offerings were Global File System (GFS), logical volume management (LVM) and device mapper (DM).

Sistina Software was acquired by Red Hat in December, 2003 for $31 million in stock. After acquisition GFS was merged into Red Hat Cluster Suite and open sourced.

== GFS ==
GFS is a cluster file system on Linux that allows servers to transparently access a single file system on a storage area network (SAN). Its highlights are performance and reliability (journaling filesystem, scalability through parallelism, etc.).

== LVM ==
LVM has become a part of the Linux kernel. It is a subsystem which allows arbitrary physical storage to be recognized as a virtual disk device. The physical storage can be remote, or it can even consist of multiple physical devices, but LVM abstracts those distinctions away from the operating system user. LVM also provides services for backing up data.
