= Oracle Net Services =

Software by Oracle Corporation

Oracle Net Services consists of sets of software developed by Oracle Corporation which enable client applications to establish and maintain network sessions with Oracle Database servers. Since Oracle databases operate in and across a variety of software and hardware environments, Oracle Corporation supplies high-level transparent networking facilities with the intention of providing networking functionality regardless of differences in nodes and protocols.

== Terminology ==
- network service name (NSN): "[a] simple name for a service that resolves to a connect descriptor" For example: sales.acme.co.uk

== Components ==
Oracle Corporation defines Oracle Net Services as comprising:

- Oracle net
- listener
- Oracle Connection Manager
- Oracle Net Configuration assistant
- Oracle Net Manager

=== Oracle Net ===
Oracle Net, a proprietary networking stack, runs both on client devices and on Oracle database servers in order to set up and maintain connections and messaging between client applications and servers. Oracle Net (formerly called "SQL*Net" or "Net8") comprises two software components:

1. Oracle Net Foundation Layer: makes and maintains connection sessions. The Oracle Net Foundation Layer establishes and also maintains the connection between the client application and server. It must reside on both the client and server for peer-to-peer communication to occur.
2. Oracle Protocol Support: interfaces with underlying networking protocols such as TCP/IP, named pipes, or Sockets Direct Protocol (SDP).

=== The listener ===
The listener process(es) on a server detect incoming requests from clients for connection - by default on port 1521 - and manage network-traffic once clients have connected to an Oracle database. The listener uses a configuration-file - listener.ora - to help keep track of names, protocols, services and hosts. The listener.ora file can include three sorts of parameters:

1. listener-address entries
2. SID_LIST entries
3. control entries

Apart from pre-defined and known statically-registered databases, a listener can also accept dynamic service registration from a database.

=== Oracle Connection Manager ===
The Oracle Connection Manager (CMAN) acts as a lightweight router for Oracle Net packets.

=== Oracle Net Manager ===
Oracle Net Manager, a GUI tool, configures Oracle Net Services for an Oracle home on a local client or server host. (Prior to Oracle 9i known as "Net8 Assistant".)

== Associated software ==
=== Utilities and tools ===
- tnsping: determines the accessibility of an Oracle net service.

=== Software suites ===
Oracle software integrating closely with and/or depending on Oracle Net Services includes:

- Oracle Clusterware
- Oracle Data Guard
- Oracle Enterprise Manager
- Oracle Internet Directory
- Oracle RAC (real application clusters)
- Oracle Streams

== See also ==
- Transparent Network Substrate (TNS)
