= Oracle Database Appliance =

Oracle-engineered system

The Oracle Database Appliance (ODA) is a database server appliance made by Oracle Corporation. It was introduced in September 2011 as the mid-market offering in Oracle's family of full-stack, integrated systems the company calls engineered systems. The ODA is a single rack-mounted device providing a highly-available two-node clustered database server.

== History ==
Oracle introduced its first engineered database system, Oracle Exadata, in 2008. In 2011, the company announced the Oracle Database Appliance as a smaller, less powerful alternative to Oracle Exadata at a lower price point. According to industry analysts, Oracle expected the Oracle Database Appliance to fill the gap in its product line beneath Oracle Exadata, targeting mid-market customers. The platform proved very popular with database administrators, with enough support to launch a book about the systems.

== Features ==
The Oracle Database Appliance supports more than database systems. Starting in release 2.5 (ODA V1) and 2.5.5 (ODA V2 X3-2), the Oracle Database Appliance can be deployed using Oracle VM, which allows an administrator to install the application tier along with the database.

The Oracle Database Appliance also offers a pay-as-you-grow model for Oracle licenses. This allows a customer to only license the CPU count they need and not the entire capacity of the appliance. When virtualized, this is supported for both the database and the application tier.

When the Oracle Database Appliance is connected to a ZS3 storage array, the DBA can leverage Hybrid Columnar Compression for data stored on the array to enable tiered storage and compression ratios exceeding 200%.

=== Hardware ===
The first generation of the Oracle Database Appliance (ODA V1) is a two-node cluster in a single rack-mounted chassis. Inside the chassis are two servers, configured in a cluster with shared storage. Each server includes two six-core processors (for a total of 12 cores per server), 96 GB RAM, six 1 Gigabit NICs, and two 10 Gigabit NICs. The NICs are configured in an active/passive HA (bonding) configuration. Inside, the appliance holds four 73 GB SSDs and twenty 600 GB hard disks for shared storage. Storage is configured during deployment for either double or triple mirroring (giving an overall capacity of 6 TB or 4 TB, respectively). The appliance also contains redundant power supplies and cooling fans.

Later generations of the appliance moved to a more flexible platform, utilizing Oracle X3-2 and X4-2 x86 servers and one or two SAS storage trays. Each compute node of the latest X4-based configuration includes four 10GBaseT network ports, two 12-core Intel Xeon E5-2697 v2 processors, 256 GB RAM, and optional 10 Gigabit fiber connectivity. The system can also support up to two storage trays, each with twenty 900 GB hard drives and four 200 GB SSDs for a maximum capacity of 36 TB of hard disk space and another 1.6 TB of SSD space. Single- and double-mirroring of disks is supported, for up to 18 TB of local data storage.

=== Software ===
The Oracle Database Appliance runs Oracle Linux, Oracle Grid Infrastructure for cluster- and storage-management, and a choice of Oracle Enterprise Edition, Oracle Real Application Clusters (RAC), or Oracle RAC One Node. These latter two database products leverage the clustered nature of the hardware to provide database-service failover in the event of a failure. Oracle also provides Oracle Clusterware for high-availability monitoring and cluster membership, and Oracle Automatic Storage Management (ASM) for storage and disk management.

Oracle Appliance Kit (OAK) software offers a built-in management interface.

== Administration ==
Oracle provides a deployment tool called the appliance manager to simplify deployment and make it less time-consuming. The vendor also provides special patch bundles for the database appliance, consisting of patches for firmware, the Linux OS, clustering, storage management, and database which have been tested for compatibility.

== Licensing ==
Customers can choose to license only a subset of the processor cores in the Oracle Database Appliance. This is done by disabling unnecessary processor cores in the BIOS, using a special interface. Cores can be enabled at a later time, allowing customers to increase the capacity of the appliance if required.

== Criticism ==
The Oracle Database Appliance is only available in fixed configurations. Customers cannot cluster multiple appliances together to create a larger cluster (beyond 2 servers), nor can they expand the internal disk storage of the system beyond the two storage trays. However, if a customer runs out of storage space, they can extend their storage to dNFS-attached storage. Currently, when leveraging an Oracle ZS3 array, the storage limit is approximately 3.5 PB.
