= Mitten (disambiguation) =

A mitten is a glove without individual finger openings.

Mitten(s) may also refer to:

== People ==
- William Mitten (1819–1906), English pharmaceutical chemist and authority on bryophytes
- Ruth Emma Mitten (1876-1942), American educator; county school superintendent

== Landforms ==
- West and East Mitten Buttes, a geologic formation in Monument Valley
- The Mitten, a landform on Mount Armytage in Antarctica
- Lower Peninsula of Michigan, nicknamed "the Mitten"

== Animals ==
- Chinese mitten crab, a species of crab native to Eastern Asia
- Mittens (cat), a famous cat from Wellington, New Zealand
- Polydactyl cat, also known as "mitten cat"

== Arts ==
=== Film and television ===
- The Mitten (film), a 1967 Soviet animated film
- Mittens, a character in the 2008 film Bolt
- Mittens, a kitten character in Timmy Time
- Mittens Fluff 'N' Stuff, a Lalaloopsy doll and character in the TV series
- Mittens, one of the titular characters in Mittens & Pants

=== Literature ===
- Mittens, a kitten in Beatrix Potter tale The Tale of Tom Kitten
- The Mitten (folk tale), a Ukrainian folk tale adapted to several media

=== Music ===
- "Mittens", a song by Carly Rae Jepsen
- Mittens Records, a record label founded by Julie Feeney

== Other uses ==
- Yakovlev Yak-130, NATO reporting name
- Mittens (chess engine), by Chess.com
- Mitt Romney (born 1947), American politician nicknamed "Mittens"

== See also ==
- Glove (disambiguation)
- Mitte (disambiguation), a German word for middle—Mitten is another grammatical form of Mitte
