= Sqlnet.ora =

In database computing, sqlnet.ora is a plain-text configuration file that contains the information (like tracing options, encryption, route of connections, external naming parameters etc.) on how both Oracle server and Oracle client have to use Oracle Net (formerly Net8 or SQL*Net) capabilities for networked database access.

== Location ==
The sqlnet.ora file typically resides in $ORACLE_HOME/network/admin on UNIX platforms and %ORACLE_HOME%\NETWORK\ADMIN on Windows operating systems.

== Sample file ==
NAMES.DIRECTORY_PATH= (LDAP, TNSNAMES, HOSTNAME) 
NAMES.DEFAULT_DOMAIN = ORACLE.COM
TRACE_LEVEL_CLIENT = ON
SQLNET.EXPIRE_TIME = 30
SQLNET.IDENTIX_FINGERPRINT_DATABASE = FINGRDB
AUTOMATIC_IPC = ON
SQLNET.AUTHENTICATION_SERVICES = (ALL)
SQLNET.CRYPTO_CHECKSUM_CLIENT = ACCEPTED
TNSPING.TRACE_DIRECTORY = /oracle/traces

== Profile parameters ==
This section lists and describes some sqlnet.ora file parameters.

Parameter	Purpose	Default	Values	Example
BEQUEATH_DETACH	Turning signal handling on or off (UNIX systems only).	No	Yes/No	BEQUEATH_DETACH=no
DEFAULT_SDU_SIZE	Defining the session data unit size.	2048 bytes	512 to 2 Mbytes Ora12c	DEFAULT_SDU_SIZE=512
LOG_DIRECTORY_CLIENT	Defining the destination directory for the client to write the logs.	Current directory from which the executable is started	path to the directory	LOG_DIRECTORY_CLIENT=/oracle/net/log
LOG_FILE_CLIENT	Defining client's log filename.	sqlnet.log	name of the file	LOG_FILE_CLIENT=client.log
LOG_FILE_SERVER	Defining the server's log filename.	sqlnet.log	name of the file	LOG_FILE_SERVER=server.log
SQLNET.CRYPTO_CHECKSUM_CLIENT	Client checksum behaviour defining.	accepted	accepted; rejected; requested; required	SQLNET.CRYPTO_CHECKSUM_CLIENT=rejected
SQLNET.CRYPTO_CHECKSUM_TYPES_CLIENT	Determine the crypto-checksum algorithms used by client.	all available algorithms	md5; sha1	SQLNET.CRYPTO_CHECKSUM_TYPES_CLIENT=(SHA1)
SQLNET.CRYPTO_SEED	Determine symbols to generate the cryptographic key. This parameter must not be set in CRS environments. CRS will fail to start if this value is set in CRS/Grid $ORACLE_HOME/network/admin/sqlnet.ora.	qwertyuiopasdfghjkl;zxcvbnm,.s1	10-70 characters	SQLNET.CRYPTO_SEED="kbguhfplhc5c4626fy[67vg;yd"
SSL_CIPHER_SUITES	Determine list of cryptographic ciphers used by SSL to encrypt the traffic.	None	SSL_RSA_WITH_3DES_EDE_CBC_SHA; SSL_RSA_WITH_RC4_128_SHA; SSL_RSA_WITH_RC4_128_MD5; SSL_RSA_WITH_DES_CBC_SHA; SSL_DH_anon_WITH_3DES_EDE_CBC_SHA; SSL_DH_anon_WITH_RC4_128_MD5; SSL_DH_anon_WITH_DES_CBC_SHA; SSL_RSA_EXPORT_WITH_RC4_40_MD5; SSL_RSA_EXPORT_WITH_DES40_CBC_SHA; SSL_RSA_WITH_AES_128_CBC_SHA; SSL_RSA_WITH_AES_256_CBC_SHA	SSL_CIPHER_SUITE=(ssl_rsa_with_des_cbc_sha)
