= Goldengate =

The name Goldengate or GoldenGate may reference:

- Goldengate, an integrated software suite developed by Cullinet in 1980
- GoldenGate, replication and data-integration software developed by GoldenGate Software; since 2009 marketed and controlled by Oracle Corporation

== See also ==
- Golden Gate (disambiguation)
