= Oracle Flashback =

In Oracle databases, Flashback tools allow administrators and users to view and manipulate past states of an instance's data without (destructively) recovering to a fixed point in time.

Compare the functionality of Oracle LogMiner, which identifies how and when data changed rather than its state at a given time.

== Flash Recovery Area ==
Flashback requires the Flash Recovery Area (FRA), a storage area that allows Flash Backup and Recovery operations on Oracle databases. DBAs may configure the FRA on an ASM diskgroup or on local disk. It is a specific area of disk storage that is set aside exclusively for retention of backup components such as datafile image copies, archived redo logs, and control-file autobackup copies.

The FRA feature is available from release Oracle 10g onwards.

== Availability ==
As of 2013 Oracle Corporation advertises Flashback Query as available in Oracle Express Edition, Standard One Edition, Standard Edition and Enterprise Edition. On the other hand, only users of Oracle Enterprise Edition have access to Flashback Features (Flashback Table, Flashback Database, Flashback Transaction Query).
