= TNS =

TNS can stand for:

== Places ==
- Tungsten (Cantung) Airport, Tungsten, Northwest Territories, Canada
- Tao Nan School, a primary school in Singapore
- Théâtre national de Strasbourg, the National Theatre of Strasbourg, France

== Groups ==
- The New Saints F.C., a Welsh football club, formerly Total Network Solutions F.C.
- Taylor Nelson Sofres, a market research company
- TechnoServe, a US-based international development non-profit group
- TNSrecords, a British punk rock/ska record label
- Transaction Network Services, a data communications company
- Triple Nine Society, a high IQ organisation
- The Naturist Society, a Naturist Network promoting Nude Recreation

== Other ==
- The Natural Step, a sustainability framework
- Transparent Network Substrate, an Oracle database technology
- Transcutaneous electrical nerve stimulation, also known as TENS
- TNS (DJ), South Africa DJ
- Trigeminal nerve stimulation, a therapy for ADHD
- Temporal noise shaping, an audio and video processing technique
