= Pitr =

PITR may refer to:

- Point-in-time recovery, a computing term referring to the recovery of data from a state in past
- Pitr, a character in the webcomic User Friendly
- Pitrs or Pitr, spirits of departed ancestors in Hindu culture
- PITR (game developer), a video game programmer.
