= GiveCamp =

A GiveCamp is a weekend long event where developers, database administrators, designers and other technologists volunteer their time to create web sites, small applications or training courses for local charities who otherwise would not be able to afford them.

GiveCamp was originally created in 2007 in the USA by Chris Koenig, Developer Evangelist for Microsoft. There are now events held regularly throughout the US and other countries are also starting to join in.
