= Change vector =

In an Oracle database, a change vector consists of a single change to a single data block. A change vector is the smallest unit of change recorded in a redo log (in its turn, a redo log comprises files in a proprietary format which logs a history of all changes made to the database).

== Source for further reading ==
- Change Vector
