= Read-only =

In computer technology, read-only can refer to:

- Read-only memory (ROM), a type of storage media
- Read-only access to memory using memory protection
- Read-only access to files or directories in file system permissions
- Read-only access for database administrators in database system permissions
