= Katův šleh =

Czech culinary dish

Katův šleh (literally executioner’s whipping) is a Czech dish being served in many conventional restaurants. It is a low-cost meal which can be easily and quickly prepared. It is made in many variants, however, the necessary attribute is a strong pungency or piquancy and the presence of pork or chicken meat cut into thin strips (referred to as “noodles” in Czech).

== Composition ==
- strips of chicken or pork (can be mixed together)
- onion
- chilli pepper
- hot paprika
- sweet paprika
- tomato sauce
- pickles
- black pepper powder
- worcestershire sauce
- soy sauce

== Preparation ==
Meat is fried in a pan and later is steamed with ingredients. The dish can be served with rice, cooked potatoes or French fries.

== Naming ==
The name of Katův šleh is also very variable, though the name always refers to its pungency. Names of Čertovo tajemství (Devil's Secret) or Pekelné nudličky (Hellish meat noodles) are also used from time to time.
