= Pungence =

Pungence is a very rare term no longer found in most dictionaries. It may refer to

- pungency of food ("spiciness", "hotness")
- pointedness of a leaf ("pungent leaf")
