= Golden Gate (disambiguation) =

The Golden Gate is the strait connecting the Pacific Ocean to San Francisco Bay.

Golden Gate or Golden Gates may also refer to:

== Places ==
=== Asia ===
- The accident zone within the Khumbu Icefall
- Kinmen, an island group governed by Taiwan

=== Bahamas ===
- Golden Gates (Bahamas Parliament constituency)

=== Europe ===
- Golden Gate (Constantinople), imperial entrance gate of city of Constantinople, present-day Istanbul, Turkey
- Golden Gate (Crimea), a natural rock formation
- Golden Gate (Diocletian's Palace), a city gate in Split, Croatia
- Golden Gate (Gdańsk), a city gate in Poland
- Golden Gate, Kyiv, an 11th-century-built entrance gate tower in Ukraine
  - The nearby Kyiv Metro station Zoloti Vorota (Kyiv Metro)
- Golden Gate (Vladimir) (Zolotye Vorota), the main gate for the city of Vladimir (Russia) from 1158 to 1164

=== Middle East ===
- Golden Gate (Jerusalem), part of the Temple Mount in East Jerusalem
- Palace of the Golden Gate, the main Abbasid palace in the Round City of Baghdad

=== South Africa ===
- Golden Gate Highlands National Park, in the Free State province of South Africa

=== United States ===
==== San Francisco Bay area ====
- Golden Gate, Oakland, California, a neighborhood
- Golden Gate Bridge, which extends across the Golden Gate strait
- Golden Gate National Recreation Area, a national park in the San Francisco Bay Area
- Golden Gate Park, in San Francisco

==== Other places in the U.S. ====
- Golden Gate, Florida, a CDP in Collier County, Florida
- Golden Gate, Martin County, Florida, an unincorporated community and the location of the historic Golden Gate Building built in 1925
- Golden Gate, Illinois
- Golden Gate Canyon, in Yellowstone National Park
- Golden Gate Canyon State Park, a Colorado State Park
- Golden Gate Fields, a horse racing track based in Berkeley, California, active from 1941 to 2024.

== Art, entertainment, and media ==
=== Architecture ===
- The monumental porch on the southern side of the peristyle facing the imperial apartments in Diocletian's Palace

=== Film and television ===
- Golden Gate (1981 film), a 1981 Warner Bros. Discovery TV movie
- Golden Gate (film), a 1994 film directed by John Madden
  - Golden Gate (soundtrack), the soundtrack to the 1994 film
- Golden Gate (television), a Slovak television show with Braňo Holiček
- Golden Gate, a 1994 TV movie starring David James Elliott

=== Literature ===
- The Golden Gate (MacLean novel), a 1976 novel by Alistair MacLean
- The Golden Gate (Seth novel), a 1986 novel by Vikram Seth

=== Music ===
- Golden Gate Quartet, a 1934 gospel quartet
- "Golden Gate", a 1928 song by Al Jolson
- The Golden Gate (musical group), late 1960s, early 1970s rock music ensemble
- Golden Gates, a 1989 EP by Diamond Rexx

=== Video games ===
- Golden Gate (video game), a 1997 video game

== Transport ==
- SS Golden Gate (1851), a passenger ship operated by the Pacific Mail Steamship Company, that burned and stranded on July 27, 1862
- Golden Gate (train), a named passenger train operated by the Santa Fe railroad, starting in 1938
- Golden Gate Transit, a bus and ferry operator centered on Marin County, California

== Technology ==
- macOS Golden Gate, a 2026 operating system version
- Oracle GoldenGate, an ETL software
- Goldengate, an integrated software suite developed by Cullinet in 1980

== Other uses ==
- Golden Gate Cemetery (disambiguation)
- Golden Gate Baptist Theological Seminary in Mill Valley, California
- Golden Gate Capital, a private equity buyout firm headquartered in San Francisco, California
- Golden Gate Cloning, a technique in molecular biology
- Golden Gate Hotel and Casino, in Las Vegas
- Golden Gates, Eaton Hall at Eaton Hall, Cheshire, England
- 2016 United States election interference by Russia, called "Goldengate" in reference to Watergate
