= PKB =

PKB is a three-letter abbreviation that may refer to:

- Państwowy Korpus Bezpieczeństwa, WWII Polish underground police
- Patients Know Best, a tool for allowing the patient to share medical records with clinicians
- National Awakening Party (Partai Kebangkitan Bangsa), an Islamic political party in Indonesia
- Base dissociation constant pK_{b} of a chemical compound
- Protein kinase B, an enzyme
- Mid-Ohio Valley Regional Airport in Parkersburg, West Virginia, US
- Personal knowledge base, a subjective database
- PerfKit Benchmarker of cloud performance
- PKB Corporation, a Serbian agribusiness company
