= Data Guard =

Data Guard or data guard may refer to:

- Guard (information security) - a security mechanism for computers on separate networks
- Oracle Data Guard - software for replicating Oracle databases
