= Data administration =

Data administration or data resource management is an organizational function working in the areas of information systems and computer science that plans, organizes, describes and controls data resources. Data resources are usually stored in databases under a database management system or other software such as electronic spreadsheets. In many smaller organizations, data administration is performed occasionally, or is a small component of the database administrator’s work.

In the context of information systems development, data administration ideally begins at system conception, ensuring there is a data dictionary to help maintain consistency, avoid redundancy, and model the database so as to make it logical and usable, by means of data modeling, including database normalization techniques.

== Data resource management ==
According to the Data Management Association (DAMA), data resource management is "the development and execution of architectures, policies, practices and procedures that properly manage the full data lifecycle needs of an enterprise". Data Resource management may be thought of as a managerial activity that applies information system and other data management tools to the task of managing an organization’s data resource to meet a company’s business needs, and the information they provide to their shareholders. From the perspective of database design, it refers to the development and maintenance of data models to facilitate data sharing between different systems, particularly in a corporate context. Data Resource Management is also concerned with both data quality and compatibility between data models.

Since the beginning of the information age, businesses need all types of data on their business activity. With each data created, when a business transaction is made, need data is created. With these data, new direction is needed that focuses on managing data as a critical resource of the organization to directly support its business activities. The data resource must be managed with the same intensity and formality that other critical resources are managed. Organizations must emphasize the information aspect of information technology, determine the data needed to support the business, and then use appropriate technology to build and maintain a high-quality data resource that provides that support.

Data resource quality is a measure of how well the organization's data resource supports the current and the future business information demand of the organization. The data resource cannot support just the current business information demand while sacrificing the future business information demand. It must support both the current and the future business information demand. The ultimate data resource quality is stability across changing business needs and changing technology.

A corporate data resource must be developed within single, organization-wide common data architecture. A data architecture is the science and method of designing and constructing a data resource that is business driven, based on real-world objects and events as perceived by the organization, and implemented into appropriate operating environments. It is the overall structure of a data resource that provides a consistent foundation across organizational boundaries to provide easily identifiable, readily available, high-quality data to support the business information demand.

The common data architecture is a formal, comprehensive data architecture that provides a common context within which all data at an organization's disposal are understood and integrated. It is subject oriented, meaning that it is built from data subjects that represent business objects and business events in the real world that are of interest to the organization and about which data are captured and maintained.
