= Shared-memory architecture =

Distributed computing architecture

A shared-memory architecture (SM) is a distributed computing architecture in which the nodes share the same memory as well as the same storage.

It contrasts with shared-nothing architecture, in which each node has distinct memory and storage, and with shared-disk architecture, in which the nodes share the same storage but not the same memory.

This is distinct from the use of shared memory between different programs or threads on a single node, with or without multiprocessing.

== See also ==
- Distributed database
- Shared memory
- Uniform memory access
