= Oracle Real Application Testing =

Database testing tool

Oracle Real Application Testing (RAT) provides a separately-licensed environment for controlled and reproducible testing of Oracle database use and changes.
