= Golden Gate Cemetery =

Golden Gate Cemetery may refer to:

- Golden Gate Cemetery (Croydon, Queensland), in Croydon, Queensland, Australia
- Golden Gate Cemetery (Jerusalem), in East Jerusalem
- Golden Gate Cemetery (San Francisco, California), in San Francisco, California, U.S.
- Golden Gate National Cemetery, in San Bruno, California, U.S.

== See also ==
- Golden Gate (disambiguation)
