= Mittens (chess) =

January 2023 feature on Chess.com

Mittens as depicted on Chess.com's website

Mittens is a chess engine developed by Chess.com. It was released on January 1, 2023, alongside four other engines, all of them given cat-related names. The engine became a viral sensation in the chess community, largely due to exposure through content made by chess streamers and a social media marketing campaign, which contributed to record levels of traffic to the Chess.com website and caused issues with database scalability.

Mittens was given a rating of one point by Chess.com, but it was evidently much stronger. Various chess masters have played matches against the engine, such as Hikaru Nakamura and Levy Rozman, who drew and lost their games respectively.

A month after its release, Mittens was removed from the website on February 1, as expected through Chess.com's monthly bot cycles. In December 2023, Mittens was brought back in a group of Chess.com's most popular bots of 2023. In January 2024, Mittens was removed again. As of September 2026, Mittens has been brought back as a coach.

== Release ==
Mittens was released on January 1, 2023, as part of a New Year event on Chess.com. It was one of five chess engines released, all with names related to cats. The other engines released were named Scaredy Cat, rated 800; Angry Cat, rated 1000; Mr. Grumpers, rated 1200; and Catspurrov (a pun on Garry Kasparov), rated 1400. As part of the announcement, a picture of each engine was accompanied by a short description of its character. The description given for Mittens suggested that the engine was hiding something, reading:

Mittens likes chess… But how good is she?

Of the five engines released, Mittens was by far the most popular. In December 2023, Chess.com re-released Mittens as part of a "best of 2023" group of chess bots made to showcase their most popular bots of the year.

== Design ==
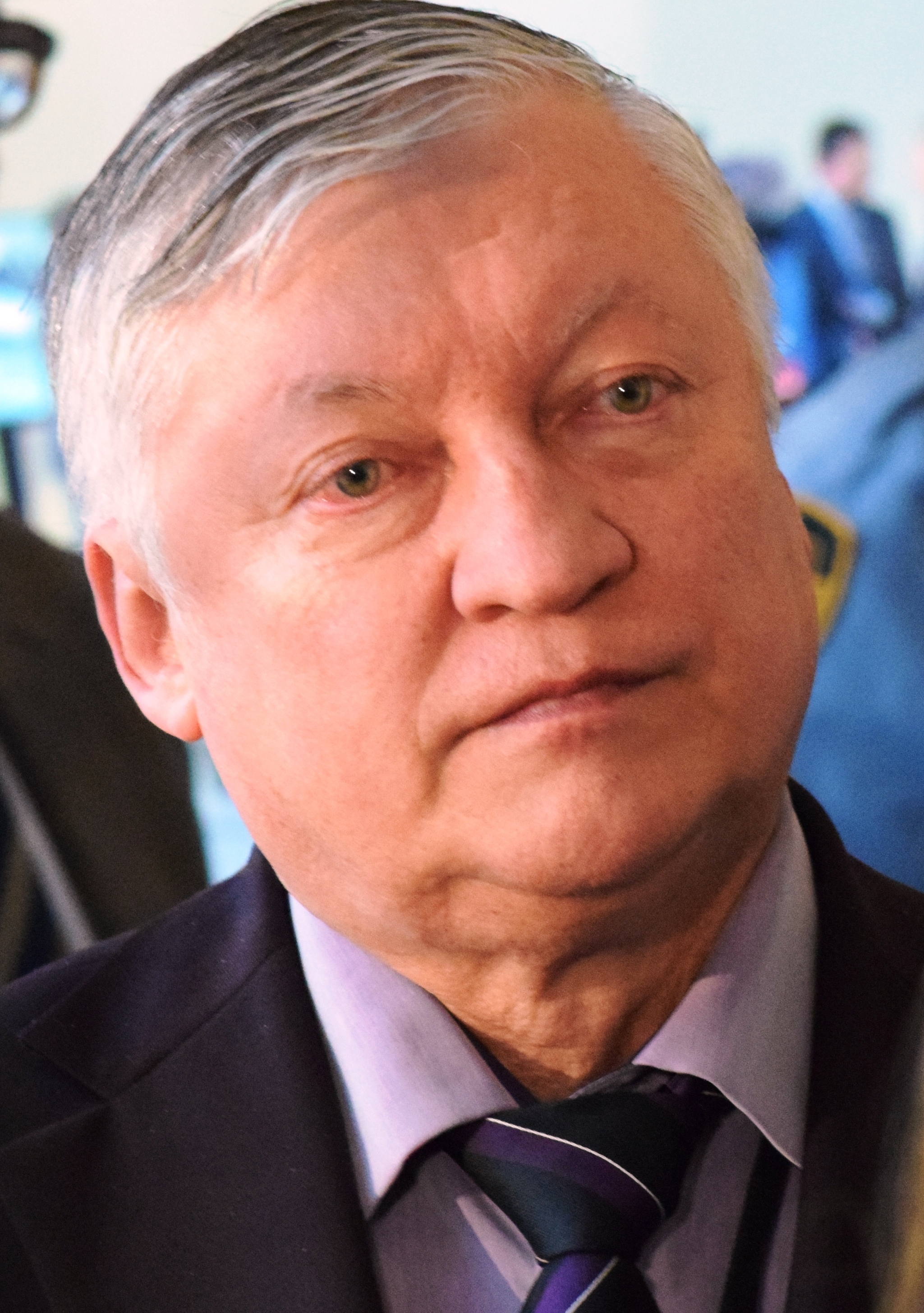
Mittens' playing style was compared to that of the Russian Grandmaster Anatoly Karpov

Mittens was conceptualized by Chess.com employee Will Whalen. Appearing as a kitten, Mittens trash talked its opponents with a selection of voice lines, which includes quotes from J. Robert Oppenheimer, Vincent van Gogh, and Friedrich Nietzsche, as well as the 1967 film Le Samouraï. The engine's "personality" was curated by a writing team headed by Sean Becker, and Marija Casic provided the engine's graphics.

Chess.com did not disclose any information about the software running the engine. It may have been based on Chess.com's Komodo Dragon 3 engine. Mittens' general strategy was to slowly grind down an opponent, a tactic likened to the playing style of Anatoly Karpov. Becker stated that the design team believed it would be "way more demoralizing and funny" for the engine to play this way. According to Hikaru Nakamura, Mittens sometimes missed the best move (or winning positions).

== Rating ==
On Chess.com, Mittens had a rating of one point. However, the engine's playing style and tactics showed that it was much stronger; Mittens won or drew games against many human top grandmasters. In an interview with CNN Business, Will Whalen stated that the idea behind giving Mittens a rating of one was to surprise its opponents, giving it the upper hand psychologically.

Estimates of Mittens' true rating range from an Elo of 3200 to 3500, because of its ability to beat other engines of around that level. An upper bound of the engine's rating was found after Levy Rozman made Mittens play against Stockfish 15, a 3700-rated engine. Mittens lost the two games that the engines played. The range of Mittens' possible ratings was summarized by Dot Esports, who stated:

It seems like she’s around the 3200–3500 rating range (in Chess.com terms, where the best human players, like Magnus Carlsen and Hikaru Nakamura, sport a 3000–3100 rating in the faster formats), as evidenced by her victories over the site’s otherwise strongest, 3200-rated bots, and her defeat to Stockfish 15, which is currently rated around 3700.

== Games ==
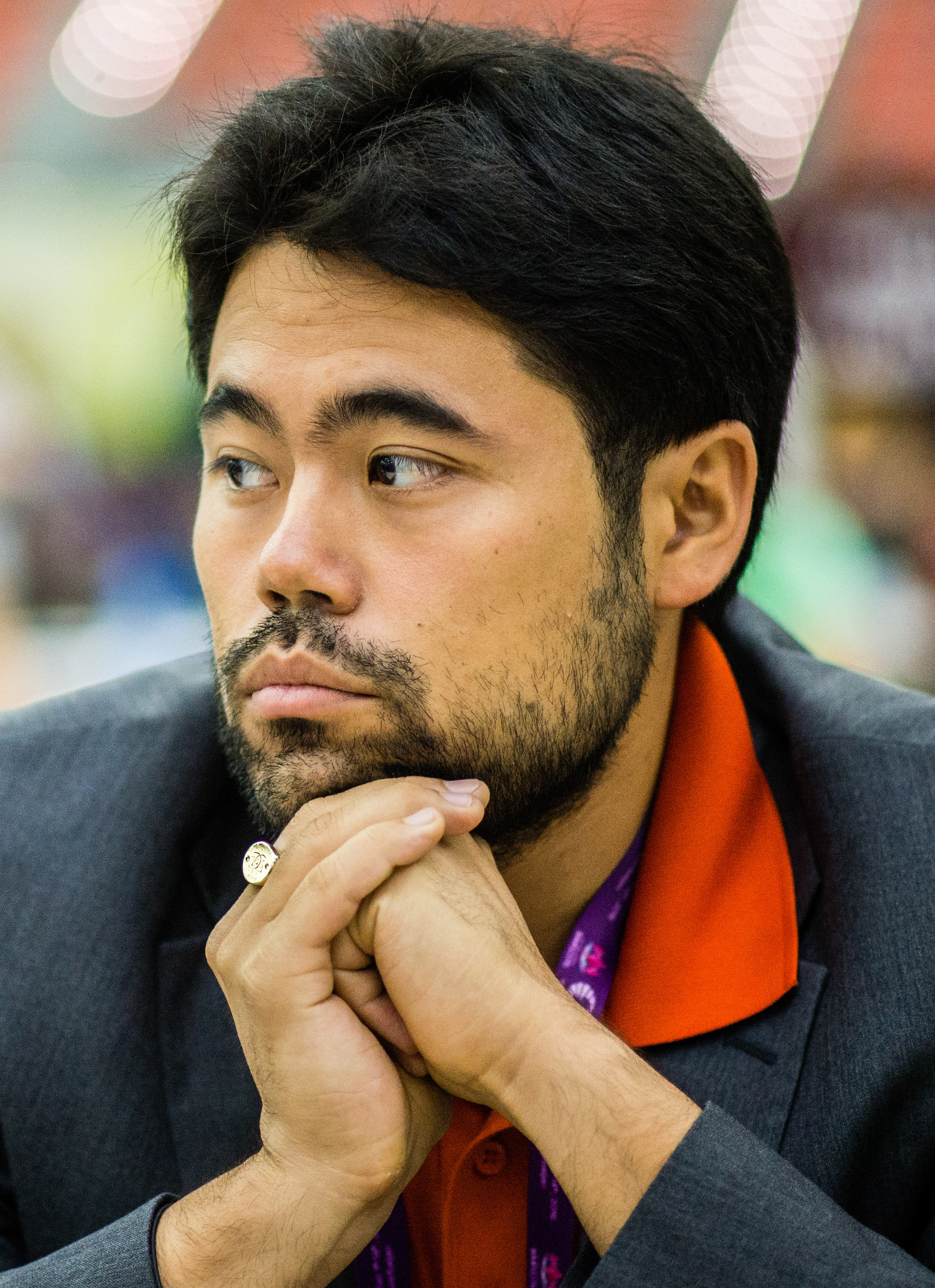
Hikaru Nakamura played a match against Mittens that ended in a draw after 166 moves

Against human players, Mittens won over 99 percent of the millions of games it played. Popular chess masters such as Hikaru Nakamura, Benjamin Bok, Levy Rozman and Eric Rosen struggled against Mittens; while Rozman and Rosen both lost against the engine, Nakamura and Bok were both able to make a draw. In particular, Nakamura's game against the engine lasted 166 moves; he was playing as White. Bok, Benjamin Finegold and Rozman later went on to win against Mittens, the latter with engine assistance from Stockfish. Magnus Carlsen publicly refused to play the engine, calling it a "transparent marketing trick" and "a soulless computer".

Against other chess engines, Mittens participated in the 2023 Chess.com Computer Chess Championship as a side act. In one of the competitions, Mittens played 150 games against an engine named after the film M3GAN, and won overall with a score of 81.5 to 68.5. This equated to 54 percent of the games played. During the event, an estimate of Mittens' rating was made at 3515 points.

== Impact ==
Mittens went viral in the chess community due to its concept and design. According to an announcement by Chess.com, a combined total of 120 million games were played against the 5 cat-themed engines over the course of January 2023, with around 40 million played against Mittens. The popularity of the engine was helped by the social media exposure created by Chess.com. This included creating an official Twitter account to promote the engine. Chess streamers like Rozman and Nakamura helped cultivate this by creating content around the engine. A video by Nakamura titled "Mittens the chess bot will make you quit chess" gained over 3.5 million views on YouTube.

On January 11, Chess.com reported issues with database scalability due to record levels of traffic: 40 percent more games had been played on Chess.com in January 2023 than any other month since the website's release. According to The Wall Street Journal, the popularity spike was more than the similar surge following the release of Netflix's The Queen's Gambit. The popularity of Mittens was cited by Chess.com as a reason for this instability. (Note: Other suggested reasons for the website's instability included a chess boxing tournament hosted by the streamer Ludwig Ahgren and other chess content created by Levy Rozman.) The problems continued throughout January. Chess.com stated that they would have to upgrade their servers and invest more in cloud computing to solve the problems caused by the website's popularity surge.

On February 1, 2023, Mittens and the other cat engines were removed from the computer section of Chess.com. They were replaced with five new engines themed around artificial intelligence. A tweet was posted on the Mittens' Twitter account after the engine's removal, reading, "This is just the beginning. Goodbye for now."
