= Transparent Network Substrate =

Transparent Network Substrate (TNS), a proprietary Oracle computer-networking technology, supports homogeneous peer-to-peer connectivity on top of other networking technologies such as TCP/IP, SDP and named pipes. TNS operates mainly for connecting to Oracle databases.

== Protocol ==
TNS uses a proprietary protocol. Some details have, however, been reverse engineered.

== See also ==
- Transparency (computing)
- Oracle Net Services
- Protocol stack
