= YCSB =

Type of computer evaluation tool

The Yahoo! Cloud Serving Benchmark (YCSB) is an open-source specification and program suite for evaluating retrieval and maintenance capabilities of computer programs. It is often used to compare the relative performance of NoSQL database management systems.

The original benchmark was developed by workers in the research division of Yahoo! who released it in 2010 with the stated goal of "facilitating performance comparisons of the new generation of cloud data serving systems", particularly for transaction-processing workloads which differed from ones measured by benchmarks designed for more traditional database management systems.

YCSB was contrasted with the TPC-H benchmark from the Transaction Processing Performance Council, with YCSB being called a big data benchmark while TPC-H is a decision support system benchmark.

YCSB was used by DBMS vendors for "benchmark marketing". It has been used in scholarly or tutorial discussions, particularly for Apache HBase. It has been used for multiple-product comparisons by industry observers such as Network World (comparing Cassandra, MongoDB, and Riak), Thumbtack Technologies (comparing Aerospike, Cassandra, Couchbase, and MongoDB), and the Polytechnic Institute and University of Coimbra (comparing Cassandra, HBase, Elasticsearch, MongoDB, Oracle NoSQL, OrientDB, Redis, Scalaris, Tarantool, and Voldemort). SanDisk Corporation published results measured on the Oracle NoSQL Database.

== Implementations ==
- Original Java Implementation
- GoLang Implementation
- C++ Implementation for LevelDB, RocksDB, LMDB Embedded Key-Value Stores
- C++ Implementation for LevelDB, RocksDB, LMDB, WiredTiger, and UDisk Embedded Key-Value Stores
