= Glove (disambiguation) =

A glove is a type of garment or utility which is designed to cover the human hand.

Glove(s) or The Glove may also refer to:

== Film ==
- The Glove (film), a 1979 cult action film
- Glove (film) (글러브), a 2011 South Korean baseball film

== Music ==
- "Glove", a song by Psapp from their 2019 album Tourists
- Gloves (album), a 2010 album by the band Operator Please
- The Glove (Schiller), a 1797 ballad by Friedrich Schiller
- The Glove (Waterhouse), a 2005 composition of Schiller's ballad by Graham Waterhouse
- The Glove, a musical supergroup featuring Robert Smith of The Cure and Steven Severin of Siouxsie & the Banshees
- Chris "The Glove" Taylor, American music producer

== Other uses ==
- Gauntlet (glove), a form of glove used for purposes including military, science, industry and drumming
- GloVe (machine learning), an unsupervised learning algorithm for obtaining vector representations for words
- The Glove, nickname of American basketball player Gary Payton
- GLOVE: OpenGL ES over Vulkan, middleware used with the Vulkan graphics API

== See also ==
- Glover (disambiguation)
- Golden Gloves (disambiguation)
