= Point-in-time recovery =

Computing term

Point-in-time recovery (PITR) in the context of computers involves systems, often databases, whereby an administrator can restore or recover a set of data or a particular setting from a time in the past. Note for example Windows's capability to restore operating-system settings from a past date (for instance, before data corruption occurred). Time Machine for macOS provides another example of point-in-time recovery.

Once PITR logging starts for a PITR-capable database, a database administrator can restore that database from backups to the state that it had at any time since.

== See also ==
- Continuous data protection
- Data version control
