= Pungency =

Hot or spicy flavor

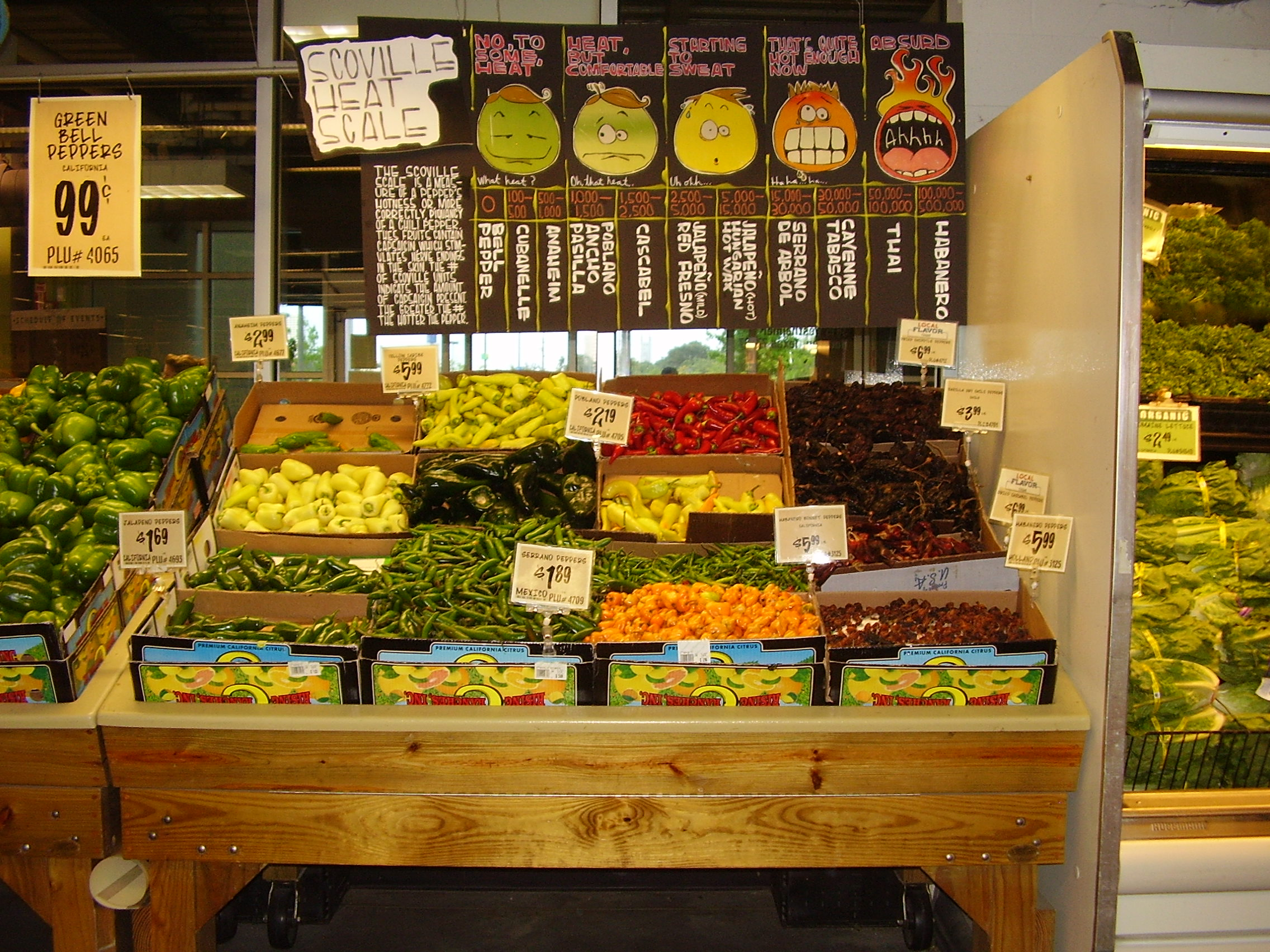
A display of hot peppers and the Scoville scale at Central Market in Houston, Texas

Pungency (/ˈpʌndʒənsi/ PUN-jən-see), commonly referred to as spiciness, hotness or heat, is a sensation that contributes to the flavor of certain foods such as chili peppers. Highly pungent foods may be experienced as unpleasant. The term piquancy (/ˈpiːkənsi/ PEEK-ən-see) is sometimes applied to foods with a lower degree of pungency that are "agreeably stimulating to the palate". In addition to chili peppers, piquant ingredients include wasabi, horseradish and mustard. The primary substances responsible for pungency are capsaicin (in chilis), piperine (in peppercorns) and allyl isothiocyanate (in radishes, mustard and wasabi).

== Terminology ==
In colloquial speech, the term "pungency" can refer to any strong, sharp smell or flavor. However, in scientific speech, it refers specifically to the "hot" or "spicy" quality of foods like chili peppers and garlic. It is the preferred term by scientists as it eliminates the ambiguity arising from use of "hot", which can also refer to temperature, and "spicy", which can also refer to spices.

For instance, a pumpkin pie can be both hot (out of the oven) and spicy (due to the common inclusion of spices such as cinnamon, nutmeg, allspice, mace, and cloves), but it is not pungent. Conversely, pure capsaicin is pungent, yet it is not naturally accompanied by a hot temperature or spices.

As the Oxford, Collins, and Merriam-Webster dictionaries explain, "piquancy" can refer to mild pungency, that is, flavors and spices that are much less strong than chilli peppers, including, for example, the strong flavor of some tomatoes. In other words, pungency always refers to a very strong taste whereas piquancy refers to any spices and foods that are "agreeably stimulating to the palate", in other words to food that is spicy in the general sense of "well-spiced".

Mildly pungent or sour foods may be referred to as tangy.

== Uses ==
Pungency is often quantified in scales that range from mild to hot. The Scoville scale measures the pungency of chili peppers, as defined by the amount of capsaicin they contain.

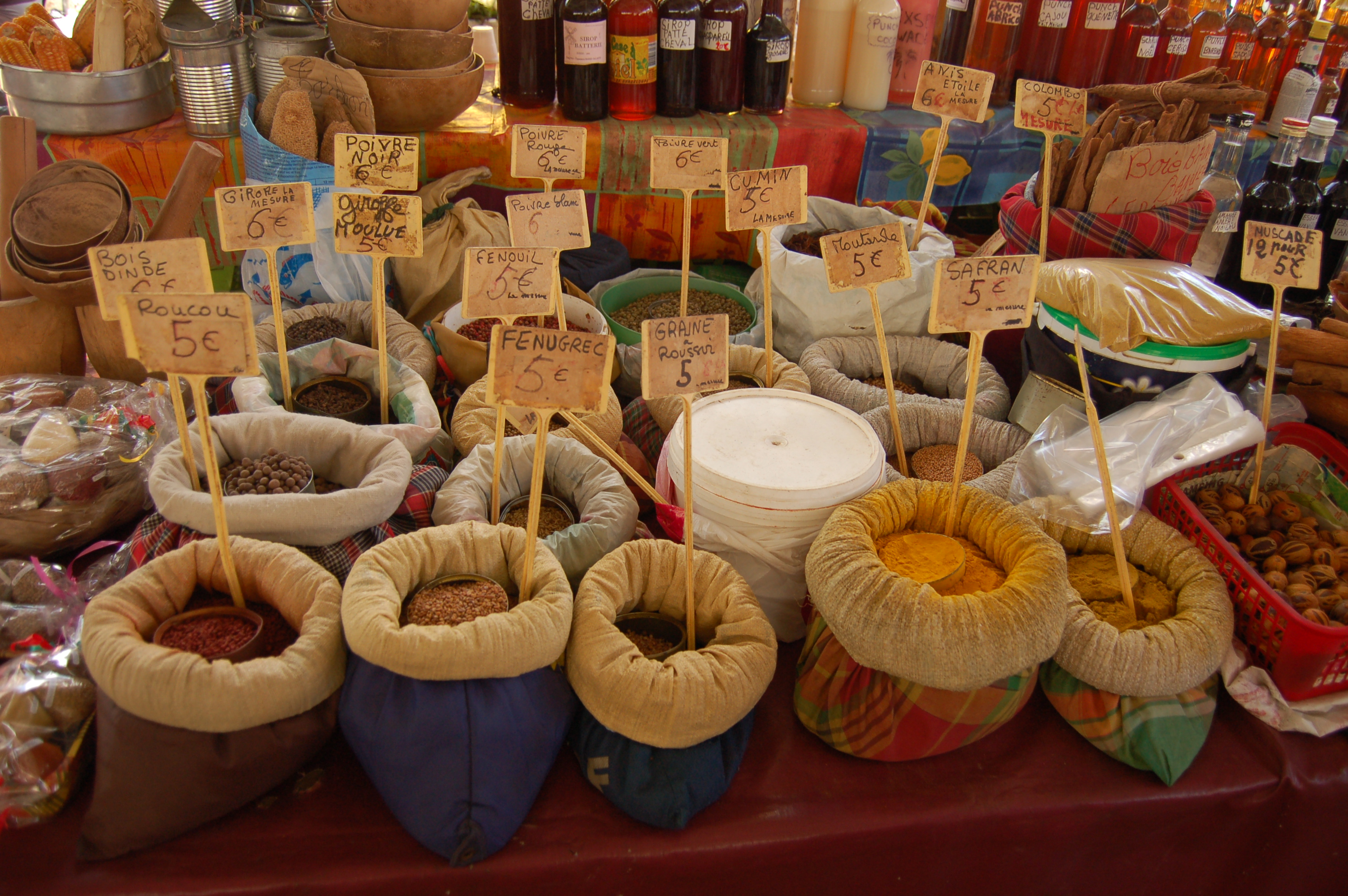
A display of spices in Guadeloupe: some pungent, some not

Pungency is not considered a taste in the technical sense because it is carried to the brain by a different set of nerves. While taste nerves are activated when consuming foods like chili peppers, the sensation commonly interpreted as "hot" results from the stimulation of somatosensory fibers in the mouth. Many parts of the body with exposed membranes that lack taste receptors (such as the nasal cavity, genitals, or a wound) produce a similar sensation of heat when exposed to pungent agents.

The pungent sensation provided by chili peppers, black pepper and other spices like ginger and horseradish plays an important role in a diverse range of cuisines across the world.

Pungent substances, like capsaicin, are used in topical analgesics and pepper sprays.

== Mechanism ==
Pungency is sensed via chemesthesis, the sensitivity of the skin and mucous membranes to chemical substances. Substances such as piperine, capsaicin, and thiosulfinates can cause a burning or tingling sensation by inducing a trigeminal nerve stimulation together with normal taste reception. The pungent feeling caused by allyl isothiocyanate, capsaicin, piperine, and allicin is caused by activation of the heat thermo- and chemosensitive TRP ion channels including TRPV1 and TRPA1 nociceptors. The pungency of chilies may be an adaptive response to microbial pathogens.

== Favoring by humans ==
Capsaicin evolved in peppers to deter seed-eating rodents that destroy seeds by grinding, thwarting their germination, while at the same time allowing birds to eat and disperse them; in birds, pepper seeds are not destroyed by consumption and digestion. Seeds consumed by birds are also dispersed to much greater distances via defecation, thus also preventing the new seedlings from competing for resources with their parent plant. It was found that birds do not feel pungency due to a lack of TRP channels, but mammals, including rodents and humans, do have them.

Unlike most other mammals, however, many humans favor pungent and spicy food (including traditionally spicy regional cuisines). Multiple reasons for that have been proposed. The thrill-seeking theory suggests that some people are attracted to spicy taste due to intense sensations or thrills. According to the antimicrobial theory, general spices have been added to foods in hot climates due to antimicrobial properties of related substances. The only other mammal known to consume pungent food is the northern treeshrew (Tupaia belangeri).

== See also ==
- Pyruvate scale – Measure of pungency in onions and garlic
- Scoville scale – Scale for measuring spiciness of peppers
- Thermoception – Sensation and perception of temperature
- Capsaicin - Pungent chemical compound in chili peppers
- Piperine
