= Golden Gate (video game) =

1997 point-and-click adventure video game

- Developer: iX Entertainment
- Publisher: Panasonic Interactive Media
- Platforms: MacOS, Microsoft Windows
- Release: April 1997
- Genre: Adventure video game

Golden Gate is a 1997 adventure video game developed by iX Entertainment and published by Panasonic Interactive Media. A 3DO Interactive Multiplayer version was in development but never released.

== Plot ==
The protagonist explores San Francisco while searching for hidden treasure. Gameplay plays with a classic point and click interface, with inventory-based puzzles and dialogue sequences to advance the story.

== Critical reception ==
Game Revolution didn't recommend it to puzzle adventure gamers. CD Mag called it a diamond in the rough. PC Game World deemed it tiresome and forgettable. Coming Soon Magazine thought the film's visual style would be copied by other games. Gamezlla praised the artwork, plot, and musical score. Electric Playground thought the gameplay was uninspired and slow. Four Fat Chicks described the game as old-fashioned. The Adrenaline Vault criticized the gameplay. Just Adventure criticized the tone while enjoying the experience of exploring San Francisco. Mac Gamer thought the music was the best part of the game. Quandary didn't think the game was good in terms of gameplay and narrative.
