= Mitte (disambiguation) =

Mitte is a district in Berlin.

Mitte (German for middle, i.e., city centre or downtown) may refer to:

== Places ==
=== Germany ===
- Mitte (locality), a locality of Mitte district in Berlin
- Mitte (Bielefeld), a district in Bielefeld
- Mitte (Bremen), a district in Bremen
- Hamburg-Mitte, a district in Hamburg
- Hanover-Mitte, a district in Hanover
- Stuttgart-Mitte, a district in Stuttgart

== Infrastructures ==
- Dresden Mitte railway station, a railway station in Dresden (Germany)
- Wien Mitte railway station, a railway station in Vienna (Austria)
