= Shared-nothing architecture =

Type of distributed computing architecture

A shared-nothing architecture (SN) is a distributed computing architecture in which each update request is satisfied by a single node (processor/memory/storage unit) in a computer cluster. The intent is to eliminate contention among nodes. Nodes do not share (independently access) the same memory or storage.

One alternative architecture is shared everything, in which requests are satisfied by arbitrary combinations of nodes. This may introduce contention, as multiple nodes may seek to update the same data at the same time. It also contrasts with shared-disk and shared-memory architectures.

SN eliminates single points of failure, allowing the overall system to continue operating despite failures in individual nodes and allowing individual nodes to upgrade hardware or software without a system-wide shutdown.

A SN system can scale simply by adding nodes, since no central resource bottlenecks the system. In databases, a term for the part of a database on a single node is a shard. A SN system typically partitions its data among many nodes. A refinement is to replicate commonly used but infrequently modified data across many nodes, allowing more requests to be resolved on a single node.

== History ==
Michael Stonebraker at the University of California, Berkeley used the term in a 1986 database paper. Teradata delivered the first SN database system in 1983. Tandem Computers NonStop systems, a shared-nothing implementation of hardware and software was released to market in 1976. Tandem Computers later released NonStop SQL, a shared-nothing relational database, in 1984.

== Applications ==
Shared-nothing is popular for web development.

Shared-nothing architectures are prevalent for data warehousing applications, although requests that require data from multiple nodes can dramatically reduce throughput.

== See also ==
- NonStop (server_computers)
- Teradata
- Oracle RAC (Shared Everything)
- Byzantine fault tolerance
- Distributed hash table (DHT)
- Exasol
- Greenplum
- Grid computing
- InfiniDB
- MySQL Cluster
- Openstack
- ScyllaDB
- Vertica
- Database scalability
- GlusterFS
