= Oracle Streams =

Oracle Streams was a product from Oracle Corporation that encouraged users of Oracle databases to propagate information within and between databases. It provided tools to capture, process ('stage') and manage database events via Advanced Queuing queues.

Oracle Streams was the flow of information either within a single database or from one database to another. Oracle Streams can be set up in homogeneous (all Oracle databases) or heterogeneous (non-Oracle and Oracle databases) environments. The Streams setup used a set of processes and database objects to share data and messages. The database changes (DDL and DML) were captured at the source; those are then staged and propagated to one or more destination databases to be applied there. Message propagation used Advanced Queuing mechanism within the Oracle databases.

Applications for the Oracle Streams tool-set included data distribution, data warehousing and data replication.

This product was later replaced with Oracle Goldengate.

== History ==
As of Oracle version 9.2 (2002), Oracle Corporation made Oracle Streams available on Oracle Enterprise Edition systems only. This happened in the wake of previous replication products: Oracle Replication (introduced with Oracle 8 in 1997) and Oracle Advanced Replication

Database Replication with Oracle 11G Streams (introduced with Oracle 9i in 2000).

In July 2009, Oracle acquired GoldenGate, a company with a heterogeneous replication solution. As of 2012 Oracle Corporation encourages customers with new applications to use Oracle GoldenGate rather than Streams.

Oracle Streams was deprecated since Oracle Database version 12c, and desupported since Oracle Database version 19c.
