= Trigeminal nerve stimulation =

Treatment for ADHD

Trigeminal nerve stimulation (TNS) or external Trigeminal nerve stimulation (eTNS) is a non-invasive, non-medication therapy for Attention deficit hyperactivity disorder approved in the United States by the FDA for the treatment of ADHD in children ages 7–12. It is also used off-label to treat ADHD in adults.

External trigeminal nerve stimulation (eTNS) is similar to transcutaneous electrical nerve stimulation (TENS), a treatment for chronic pain. A small device supplies electricity to electrodes that are placed on the skin. The device is able to modulate the intensity and frequency of electrical impulses delivered to the nerve endings in the skin.

There is ongoing investigation and research into the use of trigeminal nerve stimulation to treat other psychiatric disorders, such as depression and PTSD.
