= Database administrator =

Software profession

Occupation
- Activity sectors: Information Technology

Description
- Competencies: Databases, RDBMS, SQL, distributed computing, operating systems, storage technologies, networking, maintenance, recovery
- Education required: Typically a bachelor's degree in a computing field
- Related jobs: Data administration, System administrator, Data engineer

A database administrator (DBA) is an information technology professional who is responsible for the installation, configuration, security and ongoing maintenance of computer databases. The role may include capacity planning, database design, data migration, performance monitoring, security, troubleshooting, as well as backup and data recovery.

The occupation itself emerged in the late 1970s, alongside commercial database management systems.

== Skills ==
Required skills for database administrators include knowledge of SQL, database queries, database theory, database design, specific databases, such as Oracle, Microsoft SQL Server, or MySQL, storage technologies, distributed computing architectures, operating systems, routine maintenance, recovery, and replication/failover. In addition to relational databases, the role may extend to non-relational databases, cloud-hosted databases, as well as large-scale big data platforms.

Non-relational databases cover a range of different data models, such as key-value stores, wide-column stores, document stores and graph stores. According to Gartner, in 2024, the non-relational database management system market grew by 22.7%, compared to 10.8% for relational database management systems.

== Impact of cloud services ==
With managed cloud database services accounting for the majority of database spending, the United States Bureau of Labor Statistics suggests demand for database administrators may decline as more companies move to the cloud, allowing fewer administrators to support more companies. Some workers are expected to move into other roles, such as data architecture or software engineering.

Some professionals have started reframing the role to incorporate the practices of site reliability engineering, arguing that the movement towards infrastructure-as-code has changed database administration.

== Certification ==
Training for DBAs with accompanying certifications is widely available, offered by database vendors and third parties. Offerings include:

- IBM Certified Advanced Database Administrator – DB2 10.1 for Linux, Unix and Windows
- IBM Certified Database Administrator – DB2 10.1 for Linux, Unix, and Windows
- Oracle Database 12c Administrator Certified Professional
- Oracle MySQL 5.6 Database Administrator Certified Professional
- MCSA SQL Server 2012
- MCSE Data Platform Solutions Expert

== See also ==
- Comparison of database administration tools
- Database administration
- Database management
