= Oracle Database =

Proprietary database management system

Oracle AI Database
- Developer: Oracle Corporation
- Release: 1979; 47 years ago
- Stable release: 26ai / 14 October 2025; 12 months ago
- Written in: Assembly language, C, C++
- Type: Multi-model database management system
- License: Proprietary
- Website: www.oracle.com/database/

Oracle AI Database (commonly referred to as Oracle Database, Oracle DBMS, Oracle Autonomous Database, or simply as Oracle) is a proprietary multi-model database management system developed and marketed by Oracle Corporation. First released in 1979, it was among the earliest commercially available databases to use SQL.

It is commonly used for online transaction processing (OLTP), data warehousing (DW), and mixed database workloads. As a converged database, it supports multiple data models within a single engine, including relational, JSON document, XML, spatial, graph, text, and AI vector data, all queryable through SQL or APIs.

Oracle AI Database runs on-premises, on Oracle engineered systems such as Oracle Exadata, on Oracle Cloud Infrastructure, and as a managed Autonomous Database service. It is also offered inside Microsoft Azure, Google Cloud, and Amazon Web Services data centers through Oracle's multicloud offerings. The current long-term release is Oracle AI Database 26ai, which was introduced in October 2025.

== History ==
Larry Ellison and his two friends and former co-workers, Bob Miner and Ed Oates, started a consultancy called Software Development Laboratories (SDL) in 1977, later Oracle Corporation. SDL developed the original version of the Oracle software. The name Oracle comes from the code-name of a Central Intelligence Agency-funded project on which Ellison had worked while employed by Ampex; the CIA was Oracle's first customer, and allowed the company to use the code name for the new product.

=== Clustering, grid, and cloud computing ===
Oracle Database 12c introduced multitenant architecture in 2013. Database In-Memory, including the In-Memory Column Store, was introduced in Oracle Database 12c Release 1 version 12.1.0.2. Oracle announced Oracle Autonomous Database in 2017, with the first services becoming available in 2018. Beyond the on-premises editions, Oracle Autonomous Database automates provisioning, tuning, patching, and scaling and is offered in data-warehousing and transaction-processing variants.

== Architecture ==
Oracle Database multitenant architecture, showing the CDB root, seed PDB, and user-created pluggable databases.

=== Instances and databases ===
An Oracle AI Database system consists of an instance and a database. The instance is a set of memory structures and background processes; the database is the set of files that store data. An instance exists only in memory, and in the multitenant configuration a single instance is associated with one container database. Client programs connect to the database through server processes, established by way of the Oracle Net listener.

=== Memory ===
The principal memory structures are the System Global Area (SGA), shared by all server and background processes, and the Program Global Areas (PGA), which are private to individual processes. The shared pool, database buffer cache, and redo log buffer are components of the SGA, and the optional In-Memory Column Store also resides there. Each PGA holds session information and the work areas used to process SQL statements.

=== Processes ===
Background processes operate on the database files and use the memory structures to do their work. They include the database writer, the log writer, the checkpoint process, the system monitor and process monitor processes, and the archiver processes that copy redo logs for recovery. Server processes handle connections from client programs and run their SQL statements.

=== Storage structures ===
Storage is organized both logically and physically. Logically, data is held in tablespaces composed of segments, extents, and data blocks. Physically, the database comprises data files, control files, and online redo log files, with archived redo logs supporting media recovery. Data files can be placed on conventional file systems or managed by Automatic Storage Management (ASM), a volume manager and file system built into the database.

=== Multitenant architecture ===
Architecture of a single-instance Oracle Database, showing the instance and the database files.

Oracle Database 12c introduced the multitenant architecture, based on container databases (CDBs) and pluggable databases (PDBs). A CDB contains a root container (CDB$ROOT) that holds Oracle-supplied metadata and common users, a seed PDB (PDB$SEED) used as a template for creating new PDBs, and zero or more user-created PDBs. Beginning with Oracle Database 21c, the multitenant container database is the only supported architecture; earlier releases also supported non-container (non-CDB) databases. A PDB appears to a client or application as an independent database, while from the operating system's perspective the CDB is the database. Because PDBs are portable, they can be unplugged from one CDB and plugged into another, supporting database consolidation, cloning, and patching at the container level.

=== Concurrency and consistency ===
Oracle Database provides multiversion read consistency, also known as consistent read. When a transaction modifies data, the database writes the previous values to undo segments, allowing earlier versions of the same data to be read without blocking ongoing writes. In Oracle’s default read-committed isolation mode, each SQL statement sees only committed data, and that data is consistent as of a single point in time when the statement began; newly committed changes from other transactions are not incrementally exposed while the statement is running. Serializable and read-only transactions extend this behavior to transaction-level read consistency, so the transaction sees data as of the time the transaction began. This model allows queries to read a transactionally consistent snapshot without blocking concurrent updates; conflicting write operations may still block one another.

== Data models ==
Oracle AI Database is a converged, multi-model database: a single engine natively supports several data models and processes them using a common set of ACID transation properties, rather than relying on separate specialized systems. Independent reporting describes the engine as handling relational, JSON document, graph, spatial, and vector data together in one ACID-transactional engine, allowing these models to be combined without moving data between systems. The database-cataloging site DB-Engines likewise classifies Oracle as a multi-model system, listing document, graph, and spatial models alongside its primary relational model.

Oracle AI Database also supports native JSON data types that can be stored, indexed, and queried with SQL without requiring a predefined relational schema.

JSON Relational Duality, introduced in Oracle Database 23ai, lets the same data be accessed and updated either as relational tables or as JSON documents. Graph data models represent relationships between entities using nodes and edges, while spatial support enables the storage and querying of geographic and geometric information, including coordinates and shapes.

=== Relational data types ===
Oracle AI Database includes traditional structured data stored in tables, using numeric, character, and date/time types. These form the basis of SQL-based data storage and querying and are used alongside other data models within the same database system.

== High availability and scalability ==
Oracle's database portfolio includes technologies for high availability, disaster recovery, replication, and scale-out deployment, including Oracle Real Application Clusters (RAC), Oracle Data Guard, Oracle GoldenGate, Oracle Flashback, Oracle Globally Distributed Database, and Oracle Exadata.

=== High availability and disaster recovery ===
Oracle Real Application Clusters (Oracle RAC) is a shared-database clustering technology in which multiple database instances run on separate servers while accessing the same database. RAC was first released as part of Oracle 9.0.1 in 2001.

Oracle Data Guard maintains one or more standby databases by transporting and applying redo from a primary database. The standby databases can be used for disaster recovery and role transitions such as switchover and failover. Active Data Guard also allows read-only workloads to run on a physical standby database while redo continues to be applied.

Oracle GoldenGate is a replication product used for heterogeneous replication across different database platforms and vendors.

Oracle Flashback technologies provide point-in-time recovery features used to correct user-induced errors, including Flashback Query, Flashback Table, Flashback Drop, and Flashback Database.

=== Scalability ===
Oracle Globally Distributed Database, formerly known as Oracle Sharding, distributes data from a single logical database across multiple independent databases, called shards, so that each shard stores part of the data and can run on separate resources. Oracle AI Database 26ai added RAFT-based replication for globally distributed database deployments, supporting higher availability and automatic failover across shards.

Oracle Exadata is an engineered database system that combines database servers with storage servers. Its Smart Scan storage-offload feature moves some processing, such as predicate filtering and column projection, from the database layer to the storage layer, reducing the volume of data returned to the database servers.

== Performance ==
Oracle Database includes features intended to improve query and transaction performance on large data sets, including Database In-Memory, partitioning, parallel execution, and compression.

Database In-Memory maintains selected data in a columnar representation in memory for analytic processing while preserving the database's existing row-oriented representation and on-disk storage format.

Partitioning divides large tables and indexes into smaller physical pieces that remain a single logical object to applications. Each partition can be managed separately, and query performance can improve when the optimizer eliminates irrelevant partitions, a technique known as partition pruning.

For large operations, parallel execution can break a statement or other database task into smaller units that are processed concurrently, allowing the system to use more CPU and input/output resources than a serial execution plan.

Oracle Database also supports several table-compression methods. OLTP compression is intended for active tables, while Hybrid Columnar Compression reorganizes data into compression units and provides query and archive compression modes with higher compression ratios for less frequently updated data.

== Security ==
Oracle Database includes security features for encryption, auditing, and access control. A Common Criteria certification report for Oracle AI Database 26ai identified configurable audit capture, fine-grained access controls, user identification and authentication, and security management among the security functions of the evaluated target.

Transparent Data Encryption (TDE) encrypts database data below the SQL layer as the database reads and writes data files. Data Redaction can obscure sensitive values in query results, while data-masking tools create sanitized copies of data for use in non-production environments.

Oracle Key Vault is a software appliance that can store Oracle wallet files, Java KeyStores, Kerberos keytab files, SSH key files, and SSL certificates.

For access control, Virtual Private Database (VPD) dynamically adds predicates to SQL statements against tables or views, allowing row and column restrictions to be enforced by database policies. Oracle Label Security provides label-based row-level access control on protected tables, and Oracle Database Vault adds mandatory access controls such as realms and command rules to restrict access to schemas, objects, and SQL operations, including by highly privileged users.

Oracle Database 23ai added security and privilege-management features including SQL Firewall, schema-level privileges, and enhanced data redaction and masking.

Oracle AI Database 26ai added Deep Data Security, described in third-party coverage as embedding fine-grained authorization directly in the database for workloads such as AI agents, analytics tools, and enterprise applications. Oracle AI Database 26ai received Common Criteria certification at EAL2 augmented by ALC_FLR.3 for a specified evaluated configuration; the certification report noted that Database Vault, Oracle Label Security, external clients, DBaaS deployments, and RAC were outside that evaluated configuration.

== AI capabilities ==
In 2024, Oracle renamed the long-term Oracle Database 23c release as Oracle Database 23ai, a change independent coverage attributed to the addition of features for AI-oriented application development. Oracle AI Database 26ai introduced capabilities for agentic AI use cases, including Select AI Agent, AI Private Agent Factory, and an MCP server for Oracle Database integrated with SQLcl. Oracle AI Database 26ai architecture uses a Unified Memory Core, in which multiple data types are processed within a single transactional engine.

Vector search in Oracle AI Database is provided by AI Vector Search, introduced with the 23c/23ai; it adds a native vector data type, vector indexes, and vector-search SQL operators. These features allow semantic representations of documents, images, and other unstructured data to be stored as vectors and used for similarity search in Oracle Database. Coverage of the 23ai release also described AI Vector Search as supporting retrieval-augmented generation, a technique that combines large language models with private business data to answer natural-language questions.

In March 2026, Oracle announced the limited availability of Oracle Autonomous AI Vector Database, a fully managed service built on Autonomous AI Database. It provides Python, REST, and PL/SQL interfaces for vector search and supporting semantic search, retrieval-augmented generation and agent-based applications. The service supports vector and metadata filtering, HNSW and IVF indexes. AI Vector Search can support retrieval-augmented generation by retrieving semantically similar content for inclusion in a language-model prompt. Agentic RAG extends retrieval-augmented generation by allowing an AI agent to perform iterative retrieval or tool-use steps while constructing a response. Hybrid search combines vector similarity with lexical search or metadata filters.

In August 2026, Oracle published the VecDB Python SDK for vector search, semantic search, RAG and AI agents on Oracle AI Database 23.26.3 and above with ORDS 26.2.2 and above.

Select AI is a natural-language interface for querying data in Oracle AI Database. Independent coverage described the feature as allowing users to query data in natural language and use large language models to generate SQL for those questions. In 26ai, Select AI Agent extended this approach into a framework for building, deploying, and managing agents that can use database functions and knowledge context.

Oracle has also added support for the Model Context Protocol (MCP) through an MCP server for Oracle Database, integrated with SQLcl. InfoWorld described the server as allowing developers to build AI agents that can query, retrieve, and reason over enterprise data in Oracle Databases without custom integration layers. The 26ai release also added AI Private Agent Factory, described in third-party coverage as a framework for deploying private, containerized agents in controlled environments.

The database also includes older in-database machine-learning and data-mining capabilities. Predictive Analytics Using Oracle Data Miner describes Oracle Data Miner and Oracle Data Mining as supporting models such as association rules, classification, clustering, regression, and anomaly detection, with models built and used through SQL and PL/SQL packages. A later Apress book describes the Oracle Machine Learning platform as including OML4SQL, OML Notebooks, OML4R, and OML4Py for developing and deploying machine-learning models with Oracle Database and Autonomous Database.

== Programming and development ==
Applications primarily define, query, and manipulate data in Oracle Database through SQL. Oracle Database extends SQL with PL/SQL, a procedural language used for stored procedures, functions, triggers, and packages.

Application logic can also run inside the database in other languages. Oracle8i introduced support for Java stored procedures, allowing Java code to be called from PL/SQL. Oracle Database 21c added in-database JavaScript execution through the Oracle Multilingual Engine, with interfaces to Oracle data types, SQL, and PL/SQL stored procedures.

Applications connect to Oracle Database through client drivers and programming interfaces. Examples include the Oracle Call Interface (OCI), a low-level application programming interface commonly used from C and through higher-level language bindings; Java Database Connectivity (JDBC) for Java applications; ODP.NET for .NET applications; and python-oracledb for Python applications.

For web application development, Oracle REST Data Services (ORDS) provides a REST-oriented access layer for Oracle Database. Oracle Application Express (APEX) is a web-based application development framework built into Oracle Database. In 2024, Oracle added APEX AI Assistant to APEX 24.1, enabling natural-language application creation, SQL assistance, and conversational AI interfaces in applications.

== Editions ==
Oracle Database is offered in Enterprise Edition, Standard Edition 2, and Oracle Database Free. Oracle Autonomous Database is a managed cloud service rather than a database edition.

In September 2015, alongside the Oracle Database 12.1.0.2 release, Oracle replaced its earlier Standard Edition and Standard Edition One with a single Standard Edition 2 (SE2), a lower-cost alternative to Enterprise Edition. SE2 may be licensed only on servers with a maximum of two processor sockets, down from four in the previous Standard Edition, and it limits Real Application Clusters deployments to two single-socket nodes.

Oracle Database Free is a free, developer-focused edition. Oracle released it to developers in early 2023 as Oracle Database 23c Free, and made the underlying release generally available in 2024 as Oracle Database 23ai. It follows Oracle's earlier free Express Edition (XE), an entry-level, resource-limited edition offered for development and evaluation.

Oracle also offers the database as a fully managed cloud service, Oracle Autonomous Database, which automates administration and was introduced for data-warehousing workloads in 2017 before expanding to transaction processing.

== Releases and versions ==
Oracle products follow a custom release-numbering and -naming convention. The "ai" in the current release, Oracle AI Database 26ai, stands for "Artificial Intelligence". Previous releases (e.g. Oracle Database 19c, 10g, and Oracle9i Database) have used suffixes of "c", "g", and "i" which stand for "Cloud", "Grid", and "Internet" respectively. Prior to the release of Oracle8i Database, no suffixes featured in Oracle AI Database naming conventions. There was no v1 of Oracle AI Database, as Ellison "knew no one would want to buy version 1". For some database releases, Oracle also provides an Express Edition (XE) that is free to use.

Oracle AI Database release numbering has used the following codes:

Legend: Unsupported Supported Latest version LTR = Long-Term Release, IR = Innovation Release
| Oracle Database Version | Initial Release Version | Initial Release Date | Terminal Version | Marquee Features |
| Oracle AI Database 26ai (LTR) | 23.26.0 | Starting with Release Update 23.26.0, released in October 2025, Oracle Database 23ai is replaced by Oracle AI Database 26ai. On-premises general availability followed in 2026. Applying Release Update 23.26.0 to an existing Oracle Database 23ai deployment converts it to Oracle AI Database 26ai without requiring a separate database upgrade or application re-certification | | AI Vector Search; MCP server support; Select AI Agent; AI Private Agent Factory; relational, JSON, graph, and vector data support; Oracle Deep Data Security; and vector-search capabilities for Apache Iceberg data. |
| Oracle Database 23ai (LTR) | 23.4.0 | From Release Update 23.26.0 onward, 23ai is replaced by Oracle AI Database 26ai On May 2, 2024, Oracle Database 23ai was released on Oracle Cloud Infrastructure (OCI) as cloud services, including OCI Exadata Database Service, OCI Exadata Database Cloud@Customer, and OCI Base Database Service. It is also available in Always Free Autonomous Database. Oracle Database 23c (previously released in 2023) was renamed to Oracle Database 23ai (23.4) due to the significant additional engineering effort to add features that bring AI capabilities to the data in Oracle AI Database. Oracle Database 23c (23.2 and 23.3) was released in 2023: April 2023 (Linux) Oracle Database Free - Developer Release September 2023 Oracle AI Database on Base Database Service | | AI Vector Search (includes new Vector data type, Vector indexes, and Vector SQL operators/functions), JSON Relational Duality, JSON Schema Validation, Transactional Microservices Support, OKafka, Operational Property Graphs, Support for SQL/PGQ, Schema Privileges, Developer Role, In-database SQL Firewall, TLS 1.3 Support, Integration with Azure Active Directory OAuth2, True Cache for mid-tier caching, Readable Per-PDB Standby, Globally Distributed Database with active-active RAFT-based replication, Real-time SQL Plan Management, Priority Transactions, SQL Syntax Simplification, Schema Annotations, Data Use Case Domains, Column Value Lock-free Reservations |
| Oracle Database 21c (IR) | 21.1.0 | December 2020 (cloud) August 2021 (Linux) | | Blockchain Tables, Multilingual Engine - JavaScript Execution in the Database, Binary JSON Data Type, Per-PDB Data Guard Physical Standby (aka Multitenant Data Guard), Per-PDB GoldenGate Change Capture, Self-Managing In-Memory, In-Memory Hybrid Columnar Scan, In-Memory Vector Joins with SIMD, Sharding Advisor Tool, Property Graph Visualization Studio, Automatic Materialized Views, Automatic Zone Maps, SQL Macros, Gradual Password Rollover |
| Oracle Database 19c (LTR) | 19.1.0 // 12.2.0.3 | February 2019 (Exadata) April 2019 (Linux); June 2019 (cloud) | | Active Data Guard DML Redirection, Automatic Index Creation, Real-Time Statistics Maintenance, SQL Queries on Object Stores, In-Memory for IoT Data Streams, Hybrid Partitioned Tables, Automatic SQL Plan Management, SQL Quarantine, Zero-Downtime Grid Infrastructure Patching, Finer-Granularity Supplemental Logging, Automated PDB Relocation |
| Oracle Database 18c (IR) | 18.1.0 // 12.2.0.2 | February 2018 (cloud, Exadata) July 2018 (other) | 18.17.0; January 2022 | Polymorphic Table Functions, Active Directory Integration, Transparent Application Continuity, Approximate Top-N Query Processing, PDB Snapshot Carousel, Online Merging of Partitions and Subpartitions |
| Oracle Database 12c Release 2 | 12.2.0.1; March 2017 | August 2016 (cloud) March 2017 (on-premises) | 12.2.0.1; March 2017 | Native Sharding, Analytic Views, Zero Data Loss Recovery Appliance, Exadata Cloud Service, Cloud at Customer |
| Oracle Database 12c Release 1 | 12.1.0.1 | July 2013 | 12.1.0.2; July 2014 | Multitenant architecture, In-Memory Column Store, Native JSON, SQL Pattern Matching, Database Cloud Service |
| Oracle Database 11g Release 2 | 11.2.0.1 | September 2009 | 11.2.0.4; August 2013 | Edition-Based Redefinition, Data Redaction, Hybrid Columnar Compression, Cluster File System, Golden Gate Replication, Database Appliance |
| Oracle Database 11g Release 1 | 11.1.0.6 | September 2007 | 11.1.0.7; September 2008 | Active Data Guard, Secure Files, Exadata |
| Oracle Database 10g Release 2 | 10.2.0.1 | July 2005 | 10.2.0.5; April 2010 | Real Application Testing, Database Vault, Online Indexing, Advanced Compression, Data Guard Fast-Start Failover, Transparent Data Encryption |
| Oracle Database 10g Release 1 | 10.1.0.2 | 2003 | 10.1.0.5; February 2006 | Automated Database Management, Automatic Database Diagnostic Monitor, Grid infrastructure, Oracle ASM, Flashback Database |
| Oracle9i Database Release 2 | 9.2.0.1 | 2002 | 9.2.0.8; April 2007 | Advanced Queuing, Data Mining, Streams, Logical Standby |
| Oracle9i Database | 9.0.1.0 | 2001 | 9.0.1.5; December 2003 | Oracle Real Application Clusters (RAC), Oracle XML DB |
| Oracle8i Database | 8.1.5.0 | 1998 | 8.1.7.4; August 2000 | Native internet protocols and Java, Virtual Private Database |
| Oracle8 Database | 8.0.3 | June 1997 | 8.0.6 | Recovery Manager, Partitioning. First version available for Linux. |
| Oracle 7.3 | 7.3.0 | February 1996 | 7.3.4 | Object-relational database |
| Oracle 7.2 | 7.2.0 | May 1995 | | Shared Server, XA Transactions, Transparent Application Failover |
| Oracle 7.1 | 7.1.0 | May 1994 | | Parallel SQL Execution. First version available for Windows NT. |
| Oracle7 | 7.0.12 | June 1992 | | Distributed 2-phase commit, PL/SQL stored procedures, triggers, shared cursors, cost-based optimizer |
| Oracle 6.2 | 6.2.0 | | | Oracle Parallel Server |
| Oracle v6 | 6.0.17 | 1988 | 6.0.37 | Row-level locking, SMP scalability / performance, storing of undo in database, online backup and recovery, B*Tree indexes, PL/SQL executed from compiled programs (C etc.). First version available for Novell Netware 386. |
| Oracle v5 | 5.0.22 (5.1.17) | 1985 | 5.1.22 | C2 security certification. Support for distributed database systems and client/server computing. First version available for OS/2. Correlated sub-queries. DOS version supports extended memory. |
| Oracle v4 | 4.1.4.0 | 1984 | 4.1.4.4 | Multiversion read consistency. Halloween Problem solved. Improved concurrency. First version available for MS-DOS and IBM mainframe. |
| Oracle v3 | 3.1.3 | 1983 | | Concurrency control, data distribution, and scalability. Re-written in C for portability to other operating systems, including UNIX. |
| Oracle v2 | 2.3 | 1979 | | First commercially available SQL RDBMS. Basic SQL queries, simple joins and CONNECT BY joins. SQL statements were processed atomically. Rudimentary concurrency control and database integrity. No query optimizer. Written in assembly language for the PDP-11 to run in 128KB of RAM. Ran on PDP-11 and VAX/VMS in PDP-11 compatibility mode. |
Legend: Unsupported Supported Latest version LTR = Long-Term Release, IR = Innovation Release

The Introduction to Oracle AI Database includes a brief history on some of the key innovations introduced with each major release of Oracle AI Database.

See My Oracle Support (MOS) note Release Schedule of Current Database Releases (Doc ID 742060.1) for the current Oracle AI Database releases and their patching end dates.

== Patch updates and security alerts ==
Prior to Oracle Database 18c, Oracle Corporation released Critical Patch Updates (CPUs) and Security Patch Updates (SPUs) and Security Alerts to close security vulnerabilities. These releases are issued quarterly; some of these releases have updates issued prior to the next quarterly release.

Starting with Oracle Database 18c, Oracle Corporation releases Release Updates (RUs) and Release Update Revisions (RURs). RUs usually contain security, regression (bug), optimizer, and functional fixes which may include feature extensions as well. RURs include all fixes from their corresponding RU but only add new security and regression fixes. However, no new optimizer or functional fixes are included.

== See also ==
- Comparison of relational database management systems
- Comparison of object–relational database management systems
- Database management system
- List of relational database management systems
- List of databases using MVCC
- Oracle SQL Developer
- Oracle Real Application Testing
