= Holmström's theorem =

Impossibility of efficient incentive systems

In economics, Holmström's theorem is an impossibility theorem or trilemma attributed to Bengt R. Holmström proving that no incentive system for a team of agents can make all of the following true:

1. Income equals outflow (the budget balances),
2. The system has a Nash equilibrium, and
3. The system is Pareto efficient.

Thus a Pareto-efficient system with a balanced budget does not have any point at which an agent can not do better by changing their effort level, even if everyone else's effort level stays the same, meaning that the agents can never settle down to a stable strategy; a Pareto-efficient system with a Nash equilibrium does not distribute all revenue, or spends more than it has; and a system with a Nash equilibrium and balanced budget does not maximise the total profit of everybody.

The Gibbard–Satterthwaite theorem in social choice theory is a related impossibility theorem dealing with voting systems.

== Statement of the theorem ==
Suppose there is a team of n > 1 risk neutral agents whose preference functions are strictly concave and increasing, and also additively separable in money and effort. Then, under an incentive system that distributes exactly the output among the team members, any Nash equilibrium is Pareto inefficient.

Rasmusen studies the relaxation of this problem obtained by removing the assumption that the agents are risk neutral (Holmström: "linear in money").

The economic reason for Holmström's result is a "Sharing problem". A team member faces efficient incentives if he receives the full marginal returns from an additional unit of his input. Under a budget-balanced sharing scheme, however, the team members cannot be incentivized this way. This problem would be circumvented if the output could be distributed n times instead of only once. This requires that the team members promise fixed payments to an "Anti-Sharer", as demonstrated by Kirstein and Cooter. However, if one of the team members takes over the role of the Anti-Sharer, this player has no incentive whatsoever to spend effort. The article derives conditions under which internal Anti-Sharing induces the team members to spend more effort than a budget-balanced sharing contract. The research paper that Holmström wrote named, "Moral Hazard and Observability" demonstrates the point that executive pay should not rely mainly on the company's managerial statistics, this also includes mainly stock prices and its movement along the chart. These indicators reflect collective outcomes rather than individual effort, which aligns with the theorem’s implication that linking incentives too tightly to aggregate results can lead to inefficiencies.
