= Group communication system =

Group communication software

The term Group Communication System (GCS) refers to a software platform that implements some form of group communication. Examples of group communication systems include IS-IS, Spread Toolkit, Appia framework, QuickSilver, and IBM's group services component. Message queue systems are somewhat similar.

Group communication systems commonly provide specific guarantees about the total ordering of messages, such as if the sender of a message receives it back from the GCS, then it is certain that it has been delivered to all other nodes in the system. This property is useful when constructing data replication systems.
