= Vsync (library) =

Software library written in C# for .NET

The Vsync software library is a BSD-licensed open source library written in C# for the .NET platform, providing a wide variety of primitives for fault-tolerant distributed computing, including: state machine replication, virtual synchrony process groups, atomic broadcast with several levels of ordering and durability, a distributed lock manager, persistent replicated data, a distributed key-value store (also called a Distributed Hash Table or DHT), and scalable aggregation. The system implements the virtual synchrony execution model, and includes an implementation of Leslie Lamport's Paxos Protocol.

The main author is Ken Birman, a Professor of Computer Science at Cornell University, and it is the fourth in a series of Cornell-developed software libraries for reliable multicast. The first was the Isis Toolkit, developed in 1985 and ultimately used in the New York Stock Exchange, the French Air Traffic Control System, the US Navy AEGIS and other settings.

Subsequent generations of the technology included the Horus System and the Ensemble System.

Vsync was originally released as "Isis2" in 2010, but Birman changed the name of the package in order to avoid similarity of the name to ISIS. The name Vsync is a reference to the formal model used by the system, namely virtual synchrony.
