= Swin =

Swin may refer to:

- Swin (Thames), a passage in the Thames estuary
- Swin Bridge, a skew arch bridge in County Durham
- Swin River, a river of the Canterbury, New Zealand

== People ==
- Swin Cash (born 1979), American basketball player
- Swin Hadley (1904–1970), New Zealand rugby union player
- Henry Jackson (football manager) (born c. 1850), English football manager nicknamed Swin
- Charlie Swindells (1878–1940), American baseball player nicknamed Swin

== See also ==
- Swine (disambiguation)
- Swim (disambiguation)
