= Swimmer (disambiguation) =

Swimmer most commonly refers to a participant in:

- Swimming (sport) competition
- Swimming

Swimmer, swimmers, The Swimmer, or the Swimmers may also refer to:

== Arts and entertainment ==
=== Films ===
- The Swimmer (1968 film), an American surreal drama film based on John Cheever's story, starring Burt Lancaster
- Swimmers (2005 film), an American independent drama film starring Sarah Paulson, Cherry Jones, and Shawn Hatosy
- Swimmer (2012 film), a Scottish short film
- The Swimmer (2021 film), an Israeli sports drama
- The Swimmers (2022 film), an American drama film

=== Games ===
- Swimmer (video game), a 1982 arcade game

=== Literature ===
- "The Swimmer" (poem), an 1899 poem by Adam Lindsay Gordon
- "The Swimmer" (short story), a 1964 short story by John Cheever
- The Swimmers (novel), a 2022 novel by Julie Otsuka
- The Swimmer, a biographical book by Patrick Barkham concerning Roger Deakin

=== Music and dance ===
- The Swimmers (band), a four-piece rock band from Philadelphia
- SWMRS, an American punk band
- Swimmer (ballet), a ballet by Yuri Possokhov based on the short story by John Cheever

==== Albums ====
- Swimmer (Tennis album), a 2020 album
- Swimmer (The Big Dish album), a 1986 album
- Swimming (Mac Miller album), a 2018 album

==== Songs ====
- "Swimmers", by Broken Social Scene from the 2005 album Broken Social Scene
- "The Swimmer", by Sleater-Kinney from the 2000 album All Hands on the Bad One
- "The Swimmer", by Jarrod Alonge from the 2015 album Beating a Dead Horse
- "Swimmers", a 2019 song by Zero 7

==== Visual art ====
- The Swimming Hole (a.k.a. The Swimmers), 1884–85 painting by Thomas Eakins

== People ==
- Amanda Swimmer (1921–2018), American Cherokee potter
- Darren Swimmer, American screenwriter and producer
- Ross Swimmer (born 1943), former Special Trustee for American Indians at the U.S. Department of the Interior
- Saul Swimmer (1936–2007), American documentary film director and producer

== Technology ==
- Swimmer (BEAM), a type of aquatic robot

== See also ==
- Swim (disambiguation)
- Swimming (disambiguation)
- List of swimmers
