= Vertical synchronization =

Vertical synchronization or Vsync can refer to:

- Analog television § Vertical synchronization, a process in which a pulse signal separates analog video fields
- Screen tearing § Vertical synchronization, a process in which digital graphics rendering syncs to match up with a display's refresh rate
- Vsync (library), a software library written in C# for .NET
