= Swim =

Swim or SWIM may refer to:

== Movement and sport ==
- Swimming, the useful or recreational activity of movement through water
- Swimming (sport), the competitive sport of swimming
- Aquatic locomotion, the act of biologically propelled motion through a liquid medium
- Swim, a fad dance

== Music ==
=== Artist ===
- Swim (producer), an Australian born, London based music producer born Hamish Lefevre

=== Groups and labels ===
- swim ~, a record label founded by Wire guitarist and singer Colin Newman, and Minimal Compact bass player and singer Malka Spigel

=== Albums and EPs ===
- Swim (Caribou album), a 2010 album by Caribou
- Swim (Emily's Army EP), 2014
- Swim (Feeder EP), a 1996 EP by the band Feeder, later re-released as an 11-track album
- Swim (July for Kings album), the Ohio-based rock band's 2002 major-label debut album
- Swim, a 2008 album from indie band Whispertown 2000
- S W I M, a 2015 album by Die! Die! Die! with a title believed to mean "Someone Who Isn't Me"

=== Songs ===
- "Swim" (Fishbone song), a 1993 song by the alternative rock band Fishbone
- "Swim" (BTS song), a 2026 song by South Korean boy band BTS
- "Swim", a song from Becky Hill's album Believe Me Now?
- "Swim" (Chase Atlantic song), 2017
- "Swim", a song from Bic Runga's extended play Drive
- "Swim", a song from Brockhampton's album Saturation
- "Swim", a song from Jack's Mannequin's album The Glass Passenger
- "Swim", a song from Madonna's album Ray of Light

== People ==
- Laurie Swim (born 1949), Canadian visual artist
- Teddy Swims (born 1992), American singer-songwriter

== SWIM ==
- Sander-Wozniak Integrated Machine, an Apple floppy-disk controller
- Single Wire Interface Module, a connector standard promulgated by STMicroelectronics for programming microcontrollers
- Surface Water Improvement and Management Program, a Florida state program to improve water quality
- System Wide Information Management, a technology to help provide data sharing of Air Traffic Management system information
- SWIM Protocol (Scalable Weakly consistent Infection-style process group Membership), a group membership protocol in computer science

== See also ==
- Adult Swim
- Swimmer (disambiguation)
- Swimming (disambiguation)
