= Epicurean paradox =

Logical dilemma in philosophy

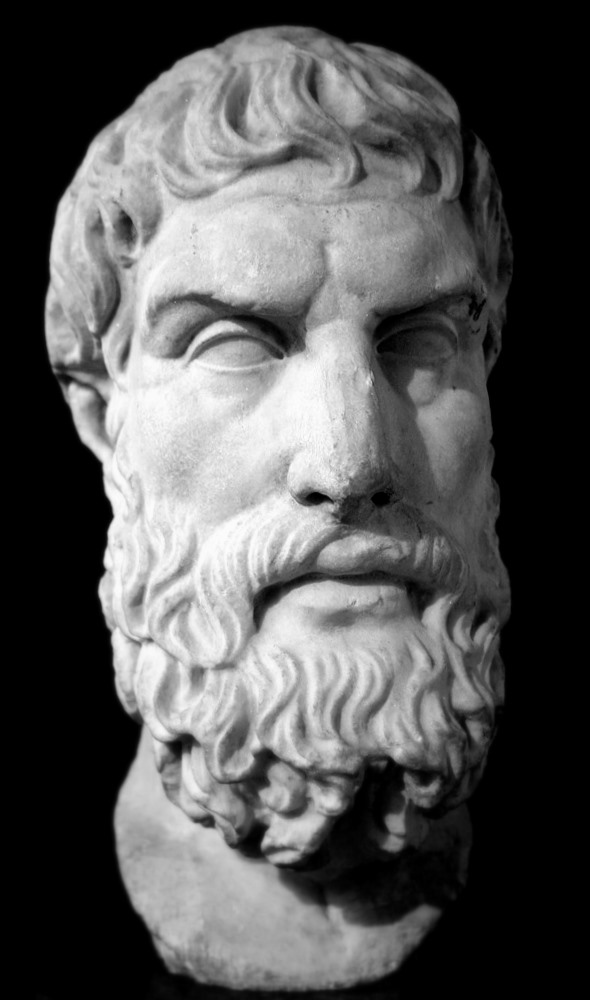
Sculpture of Epicurus, c. 3rd/2nd century BC

The Epicurean paradox is a logical dilemma about the problem of evil attributed to the Greek philosopher Epicurus, who argued against the existence of a god who is simultaneously omniscient, omnipotent, and omnibenevolent.

== The paradox ==
The paradox, reported by Lactantius, who attributes it to Epicurus, is based on some questions and proceeds step by step until it purportedly makes the concept of God paradoxical:

"God," says Epicurus, "either wants to remove evils, but cannot; or he can, but does not want to; or he does not want to and cannot; or he wants to and can. If he wants to, but cannot, he is impotent; which is inadmissible in God. If he can, but does not want to, he is envious; which is also alien to God. If he does not want to and cannot, then he is envious and impotent; and this too cannot be attributed to God. If he wants to and can, which alone is proper to God, then where do evils come from? Or why does he not remove them?

— Lactantius, On the Wrath of God

By way of these hypotheses, Epicurus concludes that God both can and wills; but since both God and evil exist, God does not care about evil, and therefore does not care about man.

== God in Epicureanism ==
Epicurus was not an atheist, as he believed in the existence of the gods. He lived in Polytheist Hellenistic world. He did, however, categorically reject the existence of a god concerned with human affairs. After him, those within the school he founded, Epicureanism, continued to reject the central tenet of atheism, i.e., the belief that no god exists. While the conception of a supreme, happy, and blessed god was popular among contemporaries, religious believers and philosophers alike, Epicurus rejected the conception. He reasoned that divine concern over the many examples of worldly suffering presented too odious and lowly a burden for a god. As such, his philosophical school argues that gods could not be expected to entertain special affection for human beings. Indeed, they may not even be aware of human existence. The relationship between the human and the divine lies in the mere existence of the gods as moral exemplars, which humans should seek to imitate. Epicurus and his school consistently argued that the gods could not be concerned with the well-being of humanity given the problem of evil; that is, the self-evident presence of suffering on earth.

== Attribution and variations ==
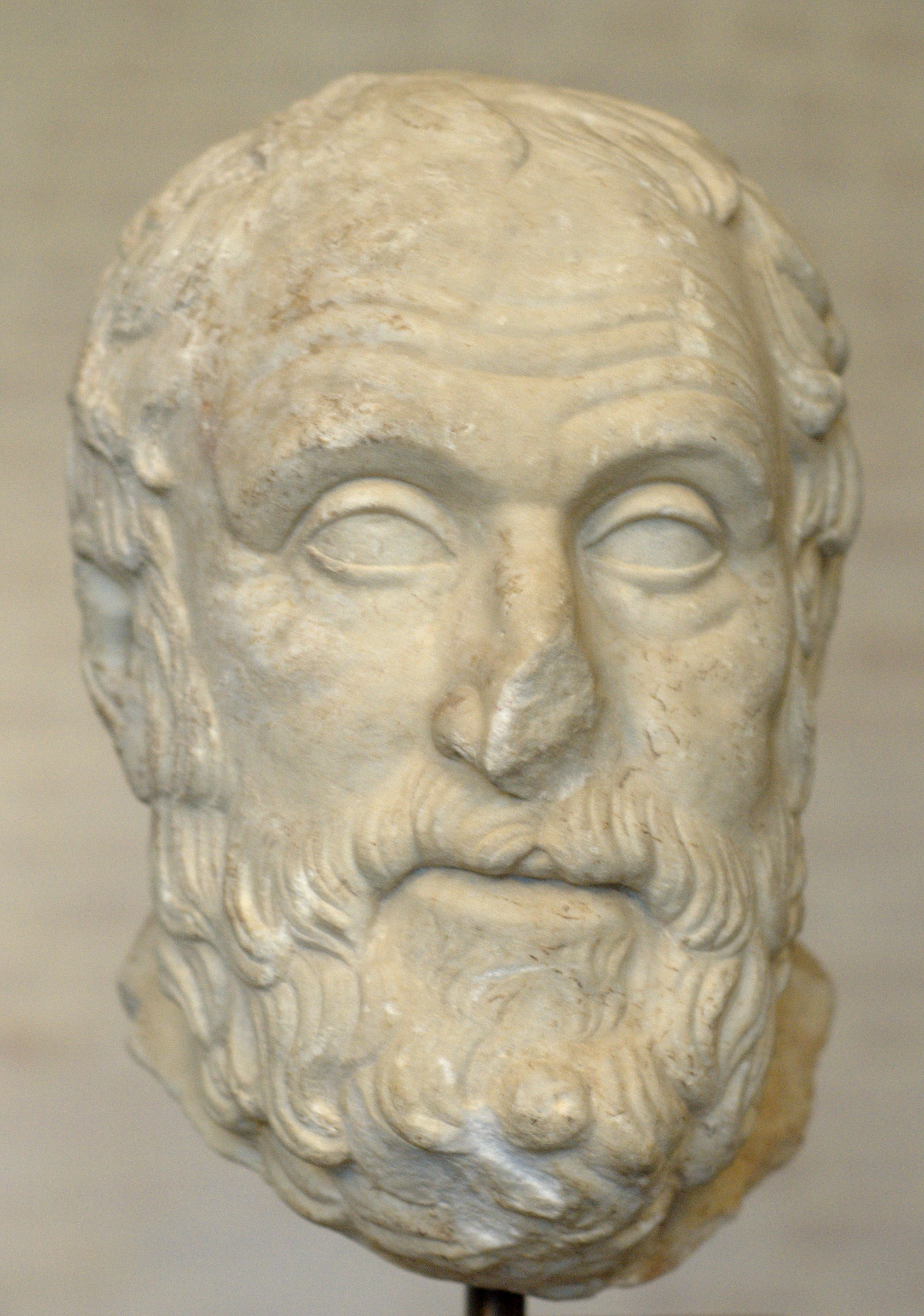
Carneades could be the true author of the paradox attributed to Epicurus.

There is no text by Epicurus confirming his authorship of the argument. Therefore, although popular with the skeptical school of Greek philosophy, it is possible that Epicurus' paradox was wrongly attributed to him by Lactantius. The latter wrote from a Christian perspective, and so would have considered Epicurus an atheist, regardless of his historical views, when addressing the paradox proposed by the Greek. German scholar Reinhold F. Glei believes that the theodicy argument is from a non-Epicurean or anti-Epicurean academic source. The oldest preserved version of this trilemma appears in the writings of the skeptic Sextus Empiricus.

Charles Bray, in his 1863 book The Philosophy of Necessity, quotes Epicurus without mentioning his source as the author of the following excerpt:

Would God be willing to prevent evil but unable? Therefore he is not omnipotent. Would he be capable, but without desire? So he is malevolent. Would he be both capable and willing? So why is there evil?

N. A. Nicholson, in his Philosophical Papers of 1864, attributes "the famous inquiries" to Epicurus, using words previously phrased by Hume. Hume's phrase occurs in the tenth book of his acclaimed Dialogues Concerning Natural Religion, published posthumously in 1779. The character Philo begins his speech by saying "Epicurus' ancient questions remain unanswered". Hume's quote comes from Pierre Bayle's influential Dictionnaire Historique et Critique, which quotes Lactantius attributing the questions to Epicurus. This attribution occurs in chapter 13 of Lactantius's De Ira Dei, which provides no sources.

Hume postulates:

[God's] power is infinite: whatever he desires is executed. But neither man nor any other animal is happy. Therefore he does not want your happiness. His wisdom is infinite: he never errs in choosing the means to any end: but the course of nature tends to be contrary to any human or animal happiness: therefore it is not established for such a purpose. Throughout the entire history of human knowledge, there are no more certain and infallible inferences than these. In what point, therefore, do your benevolence and mercy remind you of the benevolence and mercy of men?

== See also ==
- Theodicy
- Problem of evil
- Epicurus
- Epicureanism
- Carneades
- Atheism

== Bibliography ==
- Sextus Empiricus, Outlines of Pyrrhonism, Book III, 175: "those who firmly maintain that god exists will be forced into impiety; for if they say that he [god] takes care of everything, they will be saying that god is the cause of evils, while if they say that he takes care of some things only or even nothing, they will be forced to say that he is either malevolent or weak"
- Lucius Caecilius Firmianus Lactantius, The Divine Institutes
- Mark Joseph Larrimore, (2001), The Problem of Evil, pp. xix-xxi. Wiley-Blackwell
- Mark Joseph Larrimore, The Problem of Evil: a reader, Blackwell (2001), pp. xx.
- Reinhold F. Glei, Et invidus et inbecillus. Das angebliche Epikurfragment bei Laktanz, De ira dei 13,20–21, in: Vigiliae Christianae 42 (1988), pp. 47–58
