= Pragmatic General Multicast =

Computer network transport protocol

Pragmatic General Multicast (PGM) is a reliable multicast computer network transport protocol. PGM provides a reliable sequence of packets to multiple recipients simultaneously, making it suitable for applications like multi-receiver file-transfer.

Multicast is a network addressing method for the delivery of information to a group of destinations simultaneously using the most efficient strategy to deliver the messages over each link of the network only once, creating copies only when the links to the multiple destinations split (typically network switches and routers). However, like the User Datagram Protocol, multicast does not guarantee the delivery of a message stream. Messages may be dropped, delivered multiple times, or delivered out of order. A reliable multicast protocol, like PGM, adds the ability for receivers to detect lost and/or out-of-order messages and take corrective action (similar in principle to TCP), resulting in a gap-free, in-order message stream.

While TCP uses ACKs to acknowledge groups of packets sent (something that would be uneconomical over multicast), PGM uses the concept of negative acknowledgements (NAKs). A NAK is sent unicast back to the host via a defined network-layer hop-by-hop procedure whenever there is a detection of data loss of a specific sequence. As PGM is heavily reliant on NAKs for integrity, when a NAK is sent, a NAK confirmation (NCF) is sent via multicast for every hop back. Repair data (RDATA) is then sent back either from the source or from a Designated Local Repairer (DLR) at some point closer to the destination.

PGM is an IETF experimental protocol. It is not yet a standard, but has been implemented in some networking devices and operating systems, including Windows XP and later versions of Microsoft Windows, as well as in third-party libraries for Linux, Windows and Solaris.
