= Berkeley's on Fire =

Studio album by SWMRS
- Released: February 15, 2019
- Recorded: Early 2018
- Genre: Punk rock, pop-punk
- Length: 33:15
- Label: Fueled by Ramen
- Producer: Rich Costey

SWMRS chronology
Drive North (2016)	Berkeley's on Fire (2019)	Sonic Tonic (2023)

Singles from Berkeley's on Fire
- 1. "Berkeley's on Fire" Released: August 17, 2018; 2. "April in Houston" Released: November 28, 2018; 3. "Trashbag Baby" Released: January 14, 2019; 4. "Lose Lose Lose" Released: June 14, 2019

Berkeley's on Fire is the fourth album by the American punk rock band SWMRS, released on February 15, 2019 through Fueled by Ramen. It is the band's second studio album and third overall release under the name SWMRS after changing their name in late 2014. The album has been described as more mature and politically charged than the band's previous records. The album sees the band embrace wider musical influences including hip-hop and grime. It is the final album to feature bassist Seb Muller, as well as the final album to feature drummer Joey Armstrong, after sexual assault allegations were raised against him.

== Background ==
The band started recording the album in early 2018 with producer Rich Costey who has previously worked with artists such as Muse, Franz Ferdinand, Jane's Addiction, Frank Turner, Death Cab for Cutie, Biffy Clyro and At the Drive-In.

The first song to be released from the album was the title track "Berkeley's on Fire" which was released as a single on August 17, 2018. The song was inspired by an incident in early 2017 where "150 masked agitators" rioted at UC Berkeley over a planned appearance from British polemicist Milo Yiannopoulos. The release of the track coincided with the band announcing the third of their "Uncool Halloween" festival performances. The album was announced on November 28, 2018 alongside the release of the second single "April in Houston" as well as a UK and Europe tour in February/March 2019. The album's third single "Trashbag Baby" was released on January 15, 2019 and debuted as Annie Mac's Hottest Record on BBC Radio 1. Fourth single "Lose Lose Lose" was released on June 14, 2019, with the music video being released on July 9. EA Sports added it to their 2019 edition of the "NHL" series of video games.

== Critical reception ==
Professional ratings
Review scores
Source	Rating
AllMusic	4/5 stars
Dork	4/5 stars
Gigwise	7/10 stars
Kerrang!	4/5 stars
The Post	4/5 stars

Berkeley's on Fire received almost unanimous praise upon release with critics praising the band's maturity and improvement since their previous record. Neil Z. Yeung with AllMusic compared the albums use of "cool grooves and jangly bounce" to English musician Rat Boy. Yeung also described the album as sounding "like a band that's hitting their stride with a catchy blend of punk-indebted styles delivered with the conviction of a more seasoned act."

Stephen Ackroyd from Dork described the song "Lose, Lose Lose" as being "Mentos in Diet Coke levels of explosive." Jake Richardson from Kerrang! praised the album's diversity from "the riffy, Hives-esque rock of Hellboy, Bad Allergies' acoustic tenderness" to "the all-out mania of Lose Lose Lose."

Loudwire named it one of the 50 best rock albums of 2019.

== Track listing ==
No.	Title	Length
1.	"Berkeley's on Fire"	3:48
2.	"Too Much Coffee"	3:25
3.	"Trashbag Baby"	3:17
4.	"Lose Lose Lose"	3:35
5.	"April in Houston"	3:05
6.	"Lonely Ghosts"	3:12
7.	"IKEA Date"	3:43
8.	"Hellboy"	3:03
9.	"Bad Allergies"	3:33
10.	"Steve Got Robbed"	2:38
Total length:		33:15

== Personnel ==
Credits adapted from the album's liner notes.

SWMRS

- Cole Becker – vocals, rhythm guitar, art direction, design
- Max Becker – vocals, lead guitar
- Seb Mueller – bass guitar
- Joey Armstrong – drums

Additional personnel

- Rich Costey – producer, mixing
- Howie Weinberg – mastering engineer
- Will Borza – mastering assistant
- Martin Cooke – recording engineer
- Derrick Stockwell – mix assistant
- Billy Centenaro – mix assistant
- Mark Obriski – art direction, design
