= Swimming (disambiguation) =

Swimming is the self-propulsion of a human through water or another liquid, usually for recreation, sport, exercise, or survival.

Swimming may also refer to:

== Movement and sport ==
- Aquatic locomotion, animal movement through water
- Swimming (sport), the competitive sport

== Media ==
- Swimming (Mac Miller album), a 2018 album
- Swimming (French Kicks album), a 2008 album
- Swimming (The Names album), a 1982 album
- Swimming (band), an art rock band from Nottingham, United Kingdom
- Swimming (film), a 2000 film directed by Robert J. Siegel
- "Swimming", an episode of the television series Zoboomafoo
- "Swimming", a song by Pinegrove from 11:11 (2022)

== Other ==
- Swimming of witches, trial by water used in early modern witch hunts

== See also ==
- Swim (disambiguation)
- Swimmer (disambiguation)
