= Swim (Emily's Army EP) =

EP by Emily's Army
- Released: July 22, 2014
- Recorded: 2014
- Genre: Beach pop, power pop
- Length: 10:26
- Label: Burger, Rise
- Producer: Billie Joe Armstrong

Emily's Army chronology
Lost at Seventeen (2013)	Swim (2014)	Drive North (2016)

Swim is the fourth EP by American rock band Emily's Army, released on July 22, 2014, through Burger Records and Rise Records. The album is the band's first release on Burger Records and last on Rise Records. The album was produced by drummer Joey Armstrong's father, Billie Joe Armstrong. It is the band's last release under their former name "Emily's Army" after changing their name to "Swimmers" in late 2014, and later "SWMRS" in late 2015 It is also the last record to feature lead guitarist Travis Neumann and last to feature Max on bass before switching to lead guitar.

== Background ==
This is the first music of the band's to feature their "beach pop" and "power pop" sound. Lead guitarist Travis Neumann left after the recording of the EP but was featured in the music video for "Aliens Landing". The album was once again produced by Billie Joe Armstrong. The album is mixed by Chris Dugan and mastered by Chris Mathers and Matthew Voelker. The band toured in summer 2014 with Rise Against in support of the EP.

== Track list ==
No.	Title	Length
1.	"Alien's Landing"	2:36
2.	"High Waisted Shorts"	1:58
3.	"Ammonia And Bleach"	3:13
4.	"You Bit Me"	2:44
Total length:		10:26

== Personnel ==
Credits for Swim adapted from liner notes.
Emily's Army

- Cole Becker – lead vocals, rhythm guitar
- Max Becker – lead vocals, bass, art direction
- Joey Armstrong – drums, percussion, backing vocals
- Travis Neumann – lead guitar, backing vocals

Additional personal

- Billie Joe Armstrong – production
- Chris Dugan – mixing
- Chris Mathers – engineering
- Matthew Voelker – engineering
- Mike Wells – mastering
- Natalie Nesser – photography
