= Chandra–Toueg consensus algorithm =

The Chandra–Toueg consensus algorithm, published by Tushar Deepak Chandra and Sam Toueg in 1996, is an algorithm for solving consensus in a network of unreliable processes equipped with an eventually strong failure detector. The failure detector is an abstract version of timeouts; it signals to each process when other processes may have crashed. An eventually strong failure detector is one that never identifies some specific non-faulty process as having failed after some initial period of confusion, and, at the same time, eventually identifies all faulty processes as failed (where a faulty process is a process which eventually fails or crashes and a non-faulty process never fails). The Chandra–Toueg consensus algorithm assumes that the number of faulty processes, denoted by f, is less than n/2 (i.e. the minority), i.e. it assumes f < n/2, where n is the total number of processes.

== The algorithm ==
The algorithm proceeds in rounds and uses a rotating coordinator: in each round r, the process whose identity is given by r mod n is chosen as the coordinator. Each process keeps track of its current preferred decision value (initially equal to the input of the process) and the last round where it changed its decision value (the value's timestamp). The actions carried out in each round are:

1. All processes send (r, preference, timestamp) to the coordinator.
2. The coordinator waits to receive messages from at least half of the processes (including itself).
  1. It then chooses as its preference a value with the most recent timestamp among those sent.
3. The coordinator sends (r, preference) to all processes.
4. Each process waits (1) to receive (r, preference) from the coordinator, or (2) for its failure detector to identify the coordinator as crashed.
  1. In the first case, it sets its own preference to the coordinator's preference and responds with ack(r).
  2. In the second case, it sends nack(r) to the coordinator.
5. The coordinator waits to receive ack(r) or nack(r) from a majority of processes.
  1. If it receives ack(r) from a majority, it sends decide(preference) to all processes.
6. Any process that receives decide(preference) for the first time relays decide(preference) to all processes, then decides preference and terminates.

Note that this algorithm is used to decide only on one value.

== Correctness ==
=== Problem definition ===
An algorithm which "solves" the consensus problem must ensure the following properties:

1. termination: all processes decide on a value;
2. agreement: all processes decide on the same value; and
3. validity: all processes decide on a value that was some process's input value;

=== Assumptions ===
Before arguing that the Chandra–Toueg consensus algorithm satisfies the three properties above, recall that this algorithm requires n = 2*f + 1 processes, where at most f of which are faulty.

Furthermore, note that this algorithm assumes the existence of eventually strong failure detector (which are accessible and can be used to detect the crash of a node). An eventually strong failure detector is one that never identifies some specific non-faulty (or correct) process as having failed, after some initial period of confusion, and, at the same time, eventually identifies all faulty processes as failed.

=== Proof of correctness ===
Termination holds because eventually the failure detector stops suspecting some non-faulty process p and eventually p becomes the coordinator. If the algorithm has not terminated before this occurs in some round r, then every non-faulty process in round r waits to receive p's preference and responds with ack(r). This allows p to collect enough acknowledgments to send decide(preference), causing every process to terminate. Alternatively, it may be that some faulty coordinator sends decide only to a few processes; but if any of these processes are non-faulty, they broadcast the decision to all the remaining processes, causing them to decide and terminate.

Validity follows from the fact that every preference starts out as some process's input; there is nothing in the protocol that generates new preferences.

Agreement is potentially the most difficult to achieve. It could be possible that a coordinator, in one round r, might send a decide message from some value v that propagates only to a few processes before some other coordinator, in a later round r', sends a decide message for some other value v'. To show that this does not occur, observe that before the first coordinator can send decide(v), it must have received ack(r) from a majority of processes; but, then, when any later coordinator polls a majority of processes, the later majority will overlap the earlier one and v will be the most recent value. So, any two coordinators that send out decide message send out the same value.
