= Lost at Seventeen =

Studio album by Emily's Army
- Released: June 11, 2013
- Recorded: 2012–2013
- Genre: Pop rock, pop punk, garage rock
- Length: 45:27
- Label: Adeline, Rise
- Producer: Billie Joe Armstrong

Emily's Army chronology
Don't Be a Dick (2011)	Lost at Seventeen (2013)	Swim (2014)

Lost at Seventeen is the second studio album by American rock band Emily's Army, released on June 11, 2013, through Rise Records and Adeline Records. The album was produced by drummer Joey Armstrong's father, Billie Joe Armstrong. It is the band's last studio under their former name "Emily's Army" after changing their name to "Swimmers" in late 2014, and later "Swmrs" in late 2015 It is also the last record to feature lead guitarist Travis Neumann and last to feature Max Becker on bass before switching to lead guitar. It is also their last studio album to be released through Adeline Records and Rise Records.

== Background ==
After touring on Warped Tours 2011 and 2012, the band returned to the studio to record their second album in late 2012. The sound of the album changes little from their debut album Don't Be A Dick, but does have a lighter sound. Drummer Joey Armstrong's father, Billie Joe Armstrong, had an impact on the album's music.

== Track listing ==
No.	Title	Length
1.	"Part Time Bum"	2:17
2.	"Jamie"	2:04
3.	"Gübermensch"	3:18
4.	"Avenue"	2:52
5.	"I Am The President"	3:03
6.	"The Kids Just Wanna Dance"	2:50
7.	"Pathetic and in Love"	2:39
8.	"On The Roof"	3:37
9.	"The Rescuers"	4:04
10.	"War"	2:28
11.	"Rain"	3:17
12.	"If Our Music Plays Again"	3:27
13.	"18 Years"	2:17
14.	"Elephant"	2:15
15.	"Digital Drugs"	3:28
16.	"Lost at 17"	3:14
Total length:		45:27

== Personnel ==
Credits for Lost at Seventeen adapted from liner notes.

Emily's Army

- Cole Becker – Lead vocals, rhythm guitar
- Max Becker – Lead vocals, bass
- Joey Armstrong – Drums, percussion, backing vocals
- Travis Neumann – Lead guitar, backing vocals

Additional personnel

- Billie Joe Armstrong - Production
- Chris Dugan - Engineering, Mixing
- Lee Bothwick - Engineering
- Sebastian Mueller - Saxophone
