= Don't Be a Dick =

Studio album by Emily's Army
- Released: June 14, 2011
- Recorded: 2010–2011
- Genre: Punk rock; alternative rock; pop-punk
- Length: 33:57
- Label: Adeline; Rise
- Producer: Billie Joe Armstrong; Chris Dugan

Emily's Army chronology
Regan MacNeil (2010)	Don't Be a Dick (2011)	Lost at Seventeen (2013)

Singles from Don't Be A Dick
- 1. "Broadcast This" Released: February 25, 2010; 2. "Regan Macneil" Released: April 23, 2010

Don't Be a Dick is the debut studio album by American rock band Emily's Army, released on June 14, 2011, through Rise Records and Adeline Records. The album was produced by drummer Joey Armstrong's father, Billie Joe Armstrong, and long time Green Day engineer Chris Dugan.

== Background ==
Emily's Army released two singles and the demo in 2009 and 2010 and by the time they had played their first shows they started writing for their first studio album. The band started recording over Christmas 2010 and finished in March 2011. This is the band's first release on Rise Records. This is the first album produced by Billie Joe Armstrong.

== Track listing ==
No.	Title	Length
1.	"Broadcast This"	2:17
2.	"Strictly for the Birds"	2:09
3.	"Asslete"	2:23
4.	"Rom Drom"	2:13
5.	"Little Face"	2:01
6.	"Ho-lloween"	2:13
7.	"West Coast"	3:22
8.	"Statutory Brainrape"	2:23
9.	"Burn Apollo"	2:45
10.	"The Gutter"	2:20
11.	"Regan MacNeil"	2:39
12.	"I Wanna be Remembered"	2:07
13.	"Bad Cop"	2:35
14.	"Loch Lomond"	2:30

== Personnel ==
Credits adapted from liner notes.

Emily's Army

- Cole Becker – lead vocals, rhythm guitar
- Max Becker – lead vocals, bass
- Joey Armstrong – drums, percussion, backing vocals
- Travis Neumann – lead guitar, backing vocals

Additional personnel

- Billie Joe Armstrong - production
- Chris Dugan - production
- Mikaela Cohen - artwork
