= Trilemma =

Difficult choice from three options

A trilemma is a difficult choice from three options, each of which is (or appears) unacceptable or unfavourable. There are two logically equivalent ways in which to express a trilemma: it can be expressed as a choice among three unfavourable options, one of which must be chosen, or as a choice among three favourable options, only two of which are possible at the same time.

The term derives from the much older term dilemma, a choice between two or more difficult or unfavourable alternatives. The earliest recorded use of the term was by the British preacher Philip Henry in 1672, and later, apparently independently, by the preacher Isaac Watts in 1725.

== In religion ==
=== Epicurus' trilemma ===
One of the earliest uses of the trilemma formulation is that of the Greek philosopher Epicurus, rejecting the idea of an omnipotent and omnibenevolent God (as summarised by David Hume):

1. If God is unable to prevent evil, then he is not all-powerful.
2. If God is not willing to prevent evil, then he is not all-good.
3. If God is both willing and able to prevent evil, then why does evil exist?

Although traditionally ascribed to Epicurus and called Epicurus' trilemma, it has been suggested that it may actually be the work of an early skeptic writer, possibly Carneades.

In studies of philosophy, discussions, and debates related to this trilemma are often referred to as being about the problem of evil.

=== Apologetic trilemma ===
One well-known trilemma is sometimes used by Christian apologists as a proof of the divinity of Jesus, and is most commonly known in the version by C. S. Lewis. It proceeds from the premise that Jesus claimed to be God, and that therefore one of the following must be true:

1. Lunatic: Jesus was not God, but he mistakenly believed that he was.
2. Liar: Jesus was not God, and he knew it, but he said so anyway.
3. Lord: Jesus is God.

The trilemma, usually in Lewis' formulation, is often used in works of popular apologetics, although it is almost completely absent from discussions about the status of Jesus by professional theologians and biblical scholars.

== In law ==
=== The "cruel trilemma" ===
The "cruel trilemma" was an English ecclesiastical and judicial weapon developed in the first half of the 17th century, and used as a form of coercion and persecution. The format was a religious oath to tell the truth, imposed upon the accused prior to questioning. The accused, if guilty, would find themselves trapped between:

1. A breach of religious oath if they lied (taken extremely seriously in that era, a mortal sin), as well as perjury;
2. Self-incrimination if they told the truth; or
3. Contempt of court if they said nothing and were silent.

Outcry over this process led to the foundation of the right to not incriminate oneself being established in common law and was the direct precursor of the right to silence and non-self-incrimination in the Fifth Amendment to the United States Constitution.

== In philosophy ==
=== The Münchhausen trilemma ===
In the theory of knowledge the Münchhausen trilemma is an argument against the possibility of proving any certain truth even in the fields of logic and mathematics. Its name is going back to a logical proof of the German philosopher Hans Albert. This proof runs as follows: All of the only three possible attempts to get a certain justification must fail:

1. All justifications in pursuit of certain knowledge have also to justify the means of their justification and doing so they have to justify anew the means of their justification. Therefore, there can be no end. We are faced with the hopeless situation of an infinite regression.
2. One can stop at self-evidence or common sense or fundamental principles or speaking ex cathedra or at any other evidence, but in doing so the intention to install certain justification is abandoned.
3. The third horn of the trilemma is the application of a circular argument.

=== The trilemma of censorship ===
In John Stuart Mill's On Liberty, as a part of his argument against the suppression of free speech, he describes the trilemma facing those attempting to justify such suppression (although he does not refer to it as a trilemma, Leo Parker-Rees (2009) identified it as such). If free speech is suppressed, the opinion suppressed is either:

1. True – in which case society is robbed of the chance to exchange error for truth;
2. False – in which case the opinion would create a 'livelier impression' of the truth, allowing people to justify the correct view;
3. Half-true – in which case it would contain a forgotten element of the truth, that is important to rediscover, with the eventual aim of a synthesis of the conflicting opinions that is the whole truth.

=== Buddhist Trilemma ===
The Buddhist philosopher Nagarjuna uses the trilemma in his Verses on the Middle Way, giving the example that:

- a cause cannot follow its effect
- a cause cannot be coincident with its effect
- a cause cannot precede its effect

== In economics ==
=== "The Uneasy Triangle" ===
In 1952, the British magazine The Economist published a series of articles on an "Uneasy Triangle", which described "the three-cornered incompatibility between a stable price level, full employment, and ... free collective bargaining". The context was the difficulty maintaining external balance without sacrificing two sacrosanct political values: jobs for all and unrestricted labor rights. Inflation resulting from labor militancy in the context of full employment had put powerful downward pressure on the pound sterling. Runs on the pound then triggered a long series of economically and politically disruptive "stop-go" policies (deflation followed by reflation). John Maynard Keynes had anticipated the severe problem associated with reconciling full employment with stable prices without sacrificing democracy and the associational rights of labor. The same incompatibilities were also elaborated upon in Charles E. Lindblom's 1949 book, Unions and Capitalism.

=== The "impossible trinity" ===
In 1962 and 1963, a trilemma (or "impossible trinity") was introduced by the economists Robert Mundell and Marcus Fleming in articles discussing the problems with creating a stable international financial system. It refers to the trade-offs among the following three goals: a fixed exchange rate, national independence in monetary policy, and capital mobility. According to the Mundell–Fleming model of 1962 and 1963, a small, open economy cannot achieve all three of these policy goals at the same time: in pursuing any two of these goals, a nation must forgo the third.

=== Wage policy trilemmas ===
In 1989 Peter Swenson posited the existence of "wage policy trilemmas" encountered by trade unions trying to achieve three egalitarian goals simultaneously. One involved attempts to compress wages within a bargaining sector while compressing wages between sectors and maximizing access to employment in the sector. A variant of this "horizontal" trilemma was the "vertical" wage policy trilemma associated with trying simultaneously to compress wages, increase the wage share of value added at the expense of profits, and maximize employment. These trilemmas helped explain instability in unions' wage policies and their political strategies seemingly designed to resolve the incompatibilities.

=== The political trilemma of the world economy ===
Economist Dani Rodrik argues in his book, The Globalization Paradox, that democracy, national sovereignty, and global economic integration are mutually incompatible. Democratic states pose obstacles to global integration (e. g. regulatory laws, taxes and tariffs) to protect their own economies. Therefore, if we need to achieve complete economic integration, it is necessary to also remove democratic nations states. A government of some nation state could possibly pursue the goal of global integration on the expense of its own population, but that would require an authoritarian regime. Otherwise, the government would be likely replaced in the next elections.

=== Holmström's theorem ===
In Moral Hazard in Teams, economist Bengt Holmström demonstrated a trilemma that arises from incentive systems. For any team of risk-neutral agents, no incentive system of revenue distribution can satisfy all three of the following conditions: Pareto efficiency, balanced budget, and Nash stability. This entails three optimized outcomes:

1. Martyrdom: the incentive system distributes all revenue, and no agent can improve their take by changing their strategy, but at least one agent is not receiving reward in proportion to their effort.
2. Instability: the incentive system distributes all revenue, and all agents are rewarded in proportion to their effort, but at least one agent could increase their take by changing strategies.
3. Insolvency: all agents are rewarded in proportion to their effort, and no shift in strategy would improve any agent's take, but not all revenue is distributed.

=== Arrow's impossibility theorem ===
In social choice theory, economist Kenneth Arrow proved that it is impossible to create a social welfare function that simultaneously satisfies three key criteria: Pareto efficiency, non-dictatorship and independence of irrelevant alternatives.

== In politics ==
=== The Brexit trilemma ===
Following the Brexit referendum, the first May government decided that not only should the United Kingdom leave the European Union but also that it should leave the European Union Customs Union and the European Single Market. This meant that a customs and regulatory border would arise between the UK and the EU. Whilst the sea border between Great Britain and continental Europe was expected to present manageable challenges, the UK/EU border in Ireland was recognised as having rather more intractable issues. These were summarised in what became known as the "Brexit trilemma", because of three competing objectives: no hard border on the island; no customs border in the Irish Sea; and no British participation in the European Single Market and the European Union Customs Union. It is not possible to have all three.

=== The Zionist trilemma ===
Zionists have often desired that Israel be democratic, have a Jewish identity, and encompass (at least) the land of Mandatory Palestine. However, these desires (or "desiderata") seemingly form an inconsistent triad, and thus a trilemma. Palestine has an Arab majority, so any democratic state encompassing all of Palestine would likely have a binational or Arab identity.

However, Israel could be:

- Democratic and Jewish, but not in all of Palestine.
- Democratic and in all of Palestine, but not Jewish.
- Jewish and in all of Palestine, but not democratic.

This observation appears in "From Beirut to Jerusalem" (1989), by Thomas Friedman, who attributes it to the political scientist Aryeh Naor (historically, the 'trilemma' is inexact since early Zionist activists often (a) believed that Jews would migrate to Palestine in sufficiently large numbers; (b) proposed forms of bi-national governance; (c) preferred forms of communism over democracy).

=== The Žižek trilemma ===
The Zizek Trilemma illustrates the impossibility of demonstrating loyalty to the Communist regime while also being honest and intelligent.

The "Žižek trilemma" is a humorous formulation on the incompatibility of certain personal virtues under a constraining ideological framework. Often attributed to the philosopher Slavoj Žižek, it is actually quoted by him as the product of an anonymous source:

One cannot but recall here a witty formula of life under a hard Communist regime: Of the three features—personal honesty, sincere support of the regime and intelligence—it was possible to combine only two, never all three. If one were honest and supportive, one was not very bright; if one were bright and supportive, one was not honest; if one were honest and bright, one was not supportive.

=== Trilemma of democratic reform ===
The political scientist James S. Fishkin notes a trilemma with democracy. The ideal democracy maximises the values of equality, participation and deliberation, but realizing two will undermine the third. For example, competitive elections score well for equality and participation, but sacrifice quality deliberation, while citizens' assemblies score well for equality and deliberation, but sacrifice mass participation.

== In business ==
=== The project-management trilemma ===
The project management triangle as a "pick any two" Euler diagram

Arthur C. Clarke cited a management trilemma encountered when trying to achieve production quickly and cheaply while maintaining high quality. In the software industry, this means that one can pick any two of: fastest time to market, highest software quality (fewest defects), and lowest cost (headcount). This is the basis of the popular project management aphorism "Quick, Cheap, Good: Pick two," conceptualized as the project management triangle or "quality, cost, delivery".

=== The trilemma of an encyclopedia ===
The Stanford Encyclopedia of Philosophy is said to have overcome the trilemma that an encyclopedia cannot be authoritative, comprehensive and up-to-date all at the same time for any significant duration.

== In computing and technology ==
=== In data storage ===
The RAID technology may offer two of three desirable values: (relative) inexpensiveness, speed or reliability (RAID 0 is fast and cheap, but unreliable; RAID 6 is extremely expensive and reliable, with correct performance and so on). A common phrase in data storage, which is the same in project management, is "fast, cheap, good: choose two".

The same saying has been pastiched in silent computing as "fast, cheap, quiet: choose two".

In researching magnetic recording, used in hard drive storage, a trilemma arises due to the competing requirements of readability, writeability and stability (known as the Magnetic Recording Trilemma). Reliable data storage means that for very small bit sizes the magnetic medium must be made of a material with a very high coercivity (ability to maintain its magnetic domains and withstand any undesired external magnetic influences). But this coercivity must be overridden by the drive head when data is written, which means an extremely strong magnetic field in a very tiny space, but the size occupied by one bit of data eventually becomes so small that the strongest magnetic field able to be created in the space available, is not strong enough to allow data writing. In effect, a point exists at which it becomes impractical or impossible to make a working disk drive because magnetic writing activity is no longer possible on such a small scale. Heat-assisted magnetic recording (HAMR) and Microwave Assisted Magnetic Recording (MAMR) are technologies that aim to modify coercivity during writing only, to work around the trilemma.

=== In anonymous communication protocols ===
Anonymous communication protocols can offer two of the three desirable properties: strong anonymity, low bandwidth overhead, low latency overhead.

Some anonymous communication protocols offer anonymity at the cost of high bandwidth overhead, that means the number of messages exchanged between the protocol parties is very high. Some offer anonymity with the expense of latency overhead (there is a high delay between when the message is sent by the sender and when it is received by the receiver). There are protocols which aims to keep the bandwidth overhead and latency overhead low, but they can only provide a weak form of anonymity.

=== In clustering algorithms ===
Kleinberg demonstrated through an axiomatic approach to clustering that no clustering method can satisfy all three of the following fundamental properties at the same time:

1. Scale Invariance: The clustering results remain the same when distances between data points are proportionally scaled.
2. Richness: The method can produce any possible partition of the data.
3. Consistency: Changes in distances that align with the clustering structure (e.g., making closer points even closer) do not alter the results.

=== Other (technology) ===
The CAP theorem, covering guarantees provided by distributed systems, and Zooko's triangle concerning naming of participants in network protocols, are both examples of other trilemmas in technology.

== See also ==
- Dilemma
- Ternary plot
- Trichotomy (philosophy)
- Inconsistent triad
- Condorcet paradox
- Tetralemma
