= SWMRS =

American punk rock band

- SWMRS in Milwaukee in 2019. Left to right: Jakob Armstrong, Max Becker, Joey Armstrong, Cole Becker, and Seb Meuller

Background information
- Also known as: The Raining Souls; The Clocks; Emily's Army; Swimmers
- Origin: Piedmont, California, U.S.
- Genres: Punk rock; pop-punk; surf punk
- Years active: 2004–2020; 2022–present
- Labels: Adeline; Rise; Uncool; Fueled by Ramen
- Members: Cole Becker; Max Becker; Cade Becker; Sam Benavidez; Wyatt Blair
- Past members: Joey Armstrong; Seb Mueller; Travis Neumann

SWMRS (pronounced "swimmers") is an American punk rock band from the San Francisco Bay Area, consisting of brothers Max, Cole, and Cade Becker. Formed out of their earlier band Emily's Army, SWMRS blends punk, pop, and indie influences. The band has released four studio albums and toured extensively around the world.

== History ==
=== Emily's Army (2004-2014) ===
Formed by Cole Becker, Max Becker, and childhood friend Joey Armstrong after watching School of Rock, the band was originally named the Raining Souls, but they briefly changed to the Clocks,, finally settling on Emily's Army in honor of the Beckers' cousin Emily, who has cystic fibrosis.

In 2008, they released a set of songs on their MySpace page under the album name This Kid. Although This Kid is not an official studio album, a few of these songs appeared throughout their career, including "Burn Apollo" that was re-recorded on their debut album, Queens being played live in 2012, and "I Need to Be Fixed" played live during Warped Tour 2012.

The band played many small shows and festivals in California during this time. In 2009 the band added guitarist Travis Neumann. In 2011, the band released their first full-length album, Don't Be a Dick, on June 14 through Adeline Records.

The album was compared to Green Day's early work (it was produced by Joey's dad, Billie Joe Armstrong) and had major punk influences. In support of the album the band went on an East and West Coast tour in 2011. In 2012 the band returned to touring, most notably on Warped Tour and a brief West Coast tour in late 2012.

Lost at Seventeen, the band's second album, was released on June 11, 2013 via Rise Records. The band went the Vans Warped Tour to support the album for the second time in their career. They also toured for the very first time in Great Britain. They played their final shows as Emily's Army during the Soundwave Festival in 2015 in Australia.

=== Swimmers (2014-2015) ===
In early 2014 the band started writing and recording new material. Travis Neumann officially left the band shortly after the release of their EP Swim, on July 18, 2014. Bassist Sebastian Mueller joined the band while Max switched to lead guitar. In September 2014 the band officially changed their name to "Swimmers". Before this change was made, Swimmers was the name that the band used as a secret name for an underground UK tour with Matt Grocott & The Shrives and Wasters. The band released their first song as Swimmers, a cover of "Dancing on My Own", by Robyn in October 2014. The band announced that they would be releasing an EP, Silver Bullets/Palm Trees on March 30, 2015, though the release of this EP was delayed eventually shelved..

After their performance at Burgerama that year, the band was tapped by Hedi Slimane to write the soundtrack for the runway show of his 2-16 "surf sound" collection for Saint Laurent. The song the band created was an extended, seventeen minute version of what would become "Harry Dean" the first song of Drive North. Max and Cole also walked the runway for the show..

The band released four songs via SoundCloud in July 2015, two of which were uploaded by themselves, the other two, "Stink Eye", by Frankenshark—an early side-project that the band uses in live sets—and a leaked song, "Like Harry Dean Stanton".

=== SWMRS (2015-present) ===
The band started styling their name as "SWMRS" (instead of "Swimmers") in August 2015. They released a two song EP called Miley/Uncool, on September 8, 2015 on their own indie label Uncool Records. The EP's first single, "Miley", was released as a single on September 7, 2015, and received some high profile looks from mainstream media. Physical copies of the EP were sold on the band's tour with Wavves and Twin Peaks.

==== Drive North Era (2015-2018) ====
The band announced the release debut album Drive North on November 6, 2015 and released single "Figuring It Out". The album was produced by Fidlar lead vocalist Zac Carper.

The band's first studio album as SWMRS, Drive North was released February 12, 2016, via the band's imprint Uncool Records. The band toured extensively in the US, UK, and Europe in support of Drive North and appeared on the Late Late show with James Corden.

Drive North was re-released by Fueled by Ramen on October 13, 2016.This announcement was made by Annie Mac on BBC1 Radio, along with the release of SWMRS' song, Palm Trees. The following day, Drive North was rereleased under Fueled by Ramen with two additional songs: "Palm Trees" and "Lose It".

The band continued to tour extensively throughout 2017 and 2018, headlining their own shows, appearing at international festivals such as Reading and Leeds and Summer Sonic, and opening for Fidlar, All Time Low, and Weezer.

==== Berkeley's On Fire (2019-2020) ====
On February 15, 2019, they released their second album under the SWMRS name, Berkeley's on Fire. The album was markedly more ambitious than its predecessor, and was produced and mixed by Rich Costey (Muse, Rage Against the Machine). The album received a lot of press, with appearances on BBC Radio 1, and the band on the cover of Alt Press, Kerrang, and Dork magazine. The band were named 'Best International Newcomer' at the 2019 Kerrang! Awards,.

The band played the biggest shows of their career that year, appearing at major festivals like Glastonbury, Reading and Leeds, TRNSMT, Rock Werchter, and Riot Fest, as well as opening for Muse in arenas like the Stade de France.

==== Van Crash (October 2019) ====
On October 28, 2019, guitarist Max Becker along with two members of the road crew were involved in a serious car accident while driving their van from Oakland to Denver, resulting in the cancellation of the rest of the band's 2019 shows. Max sustained a host of orthopedic injuries as well as a traumatic brain injury, and took an indeterminate hiatus from playing shows as his recovery would take several years.

The band opened for Cage the Elephant in Europe and the United Kingdom in 2020, but had to return home early and cancel its remaining shows due to the pandemic.

==== Controversy (2020-2022) ====
In July 2020, Armstrong's ex-girlfriend Lydia Night of the Regrettes accused him of sexual misconduct, having dated him when he was 22 and she was 17. Armstrong responded to the allegations, saying "While I don’t agree with some of the things she said about me, it’s important she be allowed to say them and that she be supported for speaking out". Night shared the allegations amid a wave of sexual assault allegations related to several Burger Records artists. The band's accounts were silent for two years.

In October 2022, SWMRS began posting on social media again, confirming Armstrong's departure, alongside Sebastian Mueller, who were both "taking time to grow their personal lives". Addressing his silence about the allegations levied at Armstrong, Cole said "I wasn’t going to condemn my friend. Because we refused to condemn him, we got cancelled."

==== Sonic Tonic (2022-2023) ====
The band relaunched in 2022 with the addition of Cade Becker on the bass guitar. On November 4 they released the single "Dye Yer Hair" and played their first shows since 2020 in December 2022, with the three Becker brothers across the front and former roadie Jamie Seiwert on the drums. On August 23, 2023, they released "Little Miss Sunshine" and announced their third album under the SWMRS name Sonic Tonic which released on October 27, 2023.

==== Becker (2024-Present) ====
On August 14, 2024, they announced the release of their fourth studio album BECKER due for release October 11.

After the release of Becker, the band began touring more consistently again, headlining shows in the United States, Mexico, the UK, and Europe.

In 2026, the band headlined a string of shows celebrating the 10-year anniversary of their debut album Drive North, and released previously unheard demos for the album via Soundcloud along with the song "New Horse", appearing as featured artists on a billboard for Soundcloud in Times Square

== Band members ==
Current lineup

- Cole Becker – lead and backing vocals, rhythm guitar, lead guitar (2004–2009)
- Max Becker – lead and backing vocals (2004–present); lead guitar (2014–present); bass guitar (2004–2014)
- Cade Becker – bass guitar, backing vocals (2022–present)
- Sam Benavidez – drums (2022–present)
- Wyatt Blair – drums (2022–present)

Former members

- Joey Armstrong – drums, percussion, backing vocals (2004–2020)
- Sebastian "Seb" Mueller – bass guitar, backing vocals (2014–2020); saxophone (2013–2014; touring member)
- Travis Neumann – lead guitar, backing vocals (2009–2014)

Touring musicians

- Henry Webb-Jenkins – rhythm guitar, backing vocals, keyboard (2019–2020)
- Jakob Danger Armstrong – bass guitar, backing vocals (2015); rhythm guitar, backing vocals, keyboards (2018–2019); lead guitar (2020)
- Jamie Seiwert – drums, percussion, backing vocals (2022–present)
- Eric De Masi -- drums (2025-present)

Timeline

== Discography ==
Studio albums

- Don't Be a Dick (2011) (As Emily's Army)
- Lost at Seventeen (2013) (As Emily's Army)
- Drive North (2016)
- Berkeley's on Fire (2019)
- Sonic Tonic (2023)
- BECKER (2024)

EPs

- Goody Two Shoes (2009) (As Emily's Army)
- Broadcast This (2010) (As Emily's Army)
- Regan MacNeil (2010) (As Emily's Army)
- Swim (2014) (As Emily's Army)
- Miley/Uncool (2015)

Demos

- This Kid. (2008) (As Emily's Army)
