= SWIM Protocol =

Distributed computing protocol

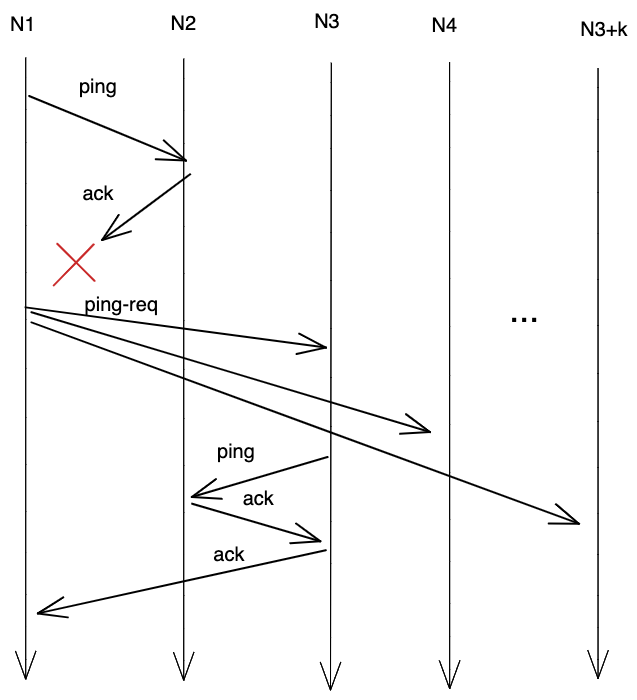
SWIM "Outsourced Heartbeats"

The Scalable Weakly Consistent Infection-style Process Group Membership (SWIM) Protocol is a group membership protocol based on "outsourced heartbeats" used in distributed systems, first introduced by Abhinandan Das, Indranil Gupta and Ashish Motivala in 2002. It is a hybrid algorithm which combines failure detection with group membership dissemination.

== Protocol ==
The protocol has two components, the Failure Detector Component and the Dissemination Component.

The Failure Detector Component functions as follows:

1. Every T' time units, each node ($N_1$) sends a ping to random other node ($N_2$) in its membership list.
2. If $N_1$ receives a response from $N_2$, $N_2$ is decided to be healthy and $N_1$ updates its "last heard from" timestamp for $N_2$ to be the current time.
3. If $N_1$ does not receive a response, $N_1$ contacts k other nodes on its list ($\{N_3,...,N_{3+k}\}$), and requests that they ping $N_2$.
4. If after T' units of time: if no successful response is received, $N_1$ marks $N_2$ as failed.

The Dissemination Component functions as follows:

- Upon $N_1$ detecting a failed node $N_2$, $N_1$ sends a multicast message to the rest of the nodes in its membership list, with information about the failed node.
- Voluntary requests for a node to enter/leave the group are also sent via multicast.

== Properties ==
The protocol provides the following guarantees:

- Strong Completeness: Full completeness is guaranteed (e.g. the crash-failure of any node in the group is eventually detected by all live nodes).
- Detection Time: The expected value of detection time (from node failure to detection) is $T'\dot{}\frac{1}{1-e^{-q_f}}$, where $T'$ is the length of the protocol period, and $q_f$ is the fraction of non-faulty nodes in the group.

== Extensions ==
The original SWIM paper lists the following extensions to make the protocol more robust:

- Suspicion: Nodes that are unresponsive to ping messages are not initially marked as failed. Instead, they are marked as "suspicious"; nodes which discover a "suspicious" node still send a multicast to all other nodes including this mechanism. If a "suspicious" node responds to a ping before some time-out threshold, an "alive" message is sent via multicast to remove the "suspicious" label from the node.
- Infection-Style Dissemination: Instead of propagating node failure information via multicast, protocol messages are piggybacked on the ping messages used to determine node liveness. This is equivalent to gossip dissemination.
- Round-Robin Probe Target Selection: Instead of randomly picking a node to probe during each protocol time step, the protocol is modified so that each node performs a round-robin selection of probe target. This bounds the worst-case detection time of the protocol, without degrading the average detection time.

== See also ==
- Failure detector
- Crash (computing)
