= Ken Birman =

American academic

- Born: November 18, 1955 (age 71); New York City, New York
- Education: Columbia University; University of California, Berkeley
- Occupations: N. Rama Rao Chair in Computer Science, College of Computing and Information Science, Cornell University
- Spouse: Anne Neirynck
- Website: www.cs.cornell.edu/ken/

Kenneth P. Birman (born November 18, 1955) is a principal architect for Microsoft Frontier Tuning. He is a retired professor in the Department of Computer Science at Cornell University, holding the title of Emeritus N. Rama Rao Chair in Computer Science.

== Education ==
Birman received his B.S. from Columbia University and Ph.D. from University of California, Berkeley.

== Research and publications ==
Birman's research is mainly concerned with scalability of distributed systems, security technologies, and system management tools employed in cloud computing.

An ACM Fellow and IEEE Fellow, Birman was Editor in Chief of ACM Transactions on Computer Systems from 1993-1998. He is also the author of several books, most recently Reliable Distributed Computing: Technologies, Web Services, and Applications, published by Springer-Verlag in May 2007.

== Virtual Synchrony, Derecho, and the Isis Toolkit ==
He is best known for developing the Isis Toolkit, which introduced the virtual synchrony execution model for multicast communication. Birman founded Isis Distributed Systems to commercialize this software, which was used by stock exchanges, for air traffic control, and in factory automation. The Isis software operated the New York and Swiss Stock Exchanges for more than a decade, and continues to be actively used in the French air traffic control system and the US Navy AEGIS warship.

The technology permits distributed systems to automatically adapt themselves when failures or other disruptions occur, to securely share keys and security policy data, and to replicate critical services so that availability can be maintained even while some system components are disabled.

Birman's research group at Cornell has created a series of open-source systems. Most recent among these is Derecho, a C++ library that provides Paxos in a form particularly well suited to modern datacenter networks, which run at very high speeds and can have extremely low node-to-node latencies. In such systems, it is important to adopt a protocol design that streams data as asynchronously as possible, and Derecho is unusual among data replication options in this respect: it uses a new "receiver-driven opportunistic batching" approach, whereby senders rarely need to pause when streaming high volume data.

== Other research ==
Other results of Birman's Cornell research effort include Bimodal Multicast, a probabilistically reliable broadcast protocol, which uses the gossip paradigm; and Astrolabe, a scalable tool for monitoring, data mining and managing large systems.

== Selected publications ==
- Sagar Jha, Jonathan Behrens, Theo Gkountouvas, Matthew Milano, Weijia Song, Edward Tremel, Robbert Van Renesse, Sydney Zink, and Kenneth P. Birman. Derecho: Fast State Machine Replication for Cloud Services. ACM Trans. Comput. Syst. 36, 2, Article 4 (April 2019), 49 pages. DOI: https://doi.org/10.1145/3302258
- Birman, Kenneth P. Guide to Reliable Distributed Systems: Building High-Assurance Applications and Cloud-Hosted Services. Textbook, 2012, 730p. 138 illus. (Springer Verlag)
- Birman, Kenneth P, Lakshmi Ganesh, and Robbert van Renesse. Running Smart Grid Control Software on Cloud Computing Architectures. Workshop on Computational Needs for the Next Generation Electric Grid, Cornell University, April 19–20, 2011. Ithaca, NY.
- Freedman, Daniel A., Tudor Marian, Kenneth P. Birman, Hakim Weatherspoon. 2010. Exact temporal characterization of a 10 Gbps optical wide-area network. Melbourne, Australia November.
- Surton, Robert, Kenneth P. Birman, R van Renesse 2013. Non-Stop Routing for BGP with Application-Driven TCP Recovery. Distributed Systems and Networks (DSN), Budapest, June.
- Birman, Kenneth P., Daniel A. Freedman and Qi Huang. Overcoming CAP with Consistent Soft-State Replication. IEEE Computer Magazine (special issue on “The Growing Impact of the CAP Theorem”). Volume 12. pp. 50–58. February 2012.
- Vigfusson, Ymir, Hussam Abu-Libdeh, Mahesh Balakrishnan, Ken Birman, Robert Burgess, Haoyuan Li, Gregory Chockler, Yoav Tock. Dr. Multicast: Rx for Data Center Communication Scalability. ACM SIGOPS European Systems Conference (Eurosys), April 2010 (Paris, France). ACM SIGOPS 2010, pp. 349–362.

== Selected awards and honors ==
- IEEE Technical Committee on Distributed Processing Outstanding Achievement Award 2009
- IEEE Tsutomu Kanai Award for Distributed Computing 2009
- Research Visionary Award (Cisco Corporation) 2008
- Appointed N. Rama Rao Professor of Computer Science 2009
- ACM Fellow (1998)
- IEEE Fellow (2014)
- ACM SIGOPS Hall of Fame Award 2013 (for "Exploiting Virtual Synchrony in Distributed Systems", published in the 1987 ACM SOSP conference).
