= Network partition =

Division of a computer network into subnets

A network partition is a division of a computer network into relatively independent subnets, either by design, to optimize them separately, or due to the failure of network devices. Distributed software must be designed to be partition-tolerant, that is, even after the network is partitioned, it still works correctly.

For example, in a network with multiple subnets where nodes A and B are located in one subnet and nodes C and D are in another, a partition occurs if the network switch device between the two subnets fails. In that case nodes A and B can no longer communicate with nodes C and D, but all nodes A-D work the same as before.

== As a CAP trade-off ==
The CAP theorem is based on three trade-offs: consistency, availability, and partition tolerance. Partition tolerance, in this context, means the ability of a data processing system to continue processing data even if a network partition causes communication errors between subsystems.
