= Inconsistent triad =

Three propositions that cannot all be true together

An inconsistent triad is a set of three propositions that cannot all be true together. For example, 'She was an orphan; Tim outlived her; Tim was her father'.

All inconsistent triads lead to trilemmas:

- If A and B are true, C must be false.
- If A and C are true, B must be false.
- If B and C are true, A must be false.

== Epistemology ==
1. Knowledge is justified true belief.
2. Humans cannot provide justification for their beliefs.
3. Humans possess knowledge.

== Political philosophy ==
1. A just society maximizes individual liberty.
2. A just society maximizes material equality.
3. A just society cannot maximize both liberty and equality.

== Ethics ==
1. Actions that maximize overall well-being are morally right.
2. Lying can sometimes maximize overall well-being.
3. Lying is always morally wrong.

== See also ==
- Classical logic
- Contradiction
- Dilemma
- Formal logic
- Reductio ad absurdum
- Trilemma
