= Drive North =

Studio album by SWMRS
- Released: February 12, 2016
- Recorded: 2015–2016
- Genres: Surf punk; pop punk
- Length: 38:51
- Labels: Uncool; Fueled by Ramen
- Producer: Zac Carper

SWMRS chronology
Miley/Uncool (2015)	Drive North (2016)	Berkeley's on Fire (2019)

Singles from Drive North
- 1. "Silver Bullet" Released: February 5, 2015; 2. "Harry Dean" Released: July 1, 2015; 3. "Miley" Released: September 7, 2015; 4. "Figuring it Out" Released: November 7, 2015; 5. "Drive North" Released: January 29, 2016

Professional ratings
Aggregate scores
Source	Rating
Metacritic	71/100
Review scores
Source	Rating
AllMusic	3/5 stars
Austin Chronicle	3/5 stars
Sputnikmusic	2.5/5 stars
Paste	6.5/10

Drive North is the third studio album by the American rock band SWMRS, released on February 12, 2016, through their own label, Uncool Records. It was re-released by Fueled By Ramen on October 14, 2016 when they added the songs "Palm Trees" and "Lose It" to the record. It is the band's first studio album and second overall release under the name SWMRS after changing their name in late 2014. It is the first album to feature bassist Seb Mueller and guitarist Max Becker, who previously played bass. It is the band's first independent release and is also the band's first studio album not to be produced by drummer Joey Armstrong's father, Billie Joe Armstrong.

== Background ==
The band started recording the album in mid-2015 with FIDLAR vocalist Zac Carper as the producer. The first track of the album's tracks, "Silver Bullet", was released on February 5, 2015. The song was originally slated to be part of the band's later-canceled EP "Silver Bullet/Palm Trees". Two of the album's tracks, "Miley" and "Uncool", were released on September 8, 2015. The band announced the album on November 7, 2015 and released the album's fourth single "Figuring it Out". The album's fifth single, "Drive North", was released on January 29, 2016. When the album was re-released through Fueled By Ramen, it included two new songs titled "Palm Trees" and "Lose It".

== Track listing ==
All tracks are written by Joey Armstrong, Cole Becker, Max Becker & Sebastian Mueller, except where noted.

Original release
No.	Title	Writer(s)	Length
1.	"Harry Dean"		2:49
2.	"Brb"		3:29
3.	"Miss Yer Kiss"	Armstrong, C. Becker, M. Becker, Mueller, Zac Carper	3:11
4.	"Turn Up"		2:35
5.	"Figuring It Out"	Armstrong, C. Becker, M. Becker, Mueller, Carper	3:57
6.	"Ruining My Pretending"	Armstrong, C. Becker, M. Becker, Mueller, Carper	3:15
7.	"Uncool"		2:44
8.	"Miley"		4:13
9.	"D'You Have a Car?"		3:18
10.	"Hannah"	Armstrong, C. Becker, M. Becker, Mueller, Carper	2:45
11.	"Silver Bullet"		3:13
12.	"Drive North"		3:22
Total length:			38:51

Reissue bonus tracks
No.	Title	Length
13.	"Palm Trees"	3:05
14.	"Lose It"	4:00
Total length:		45:56

== Personnel ==
SWMRS

- Cole Becker – lead vocals, rhythm guitar, piano, keyboards, synthesizers
- Max Becker – lead vocals, lead guitar
- Sebastian Mueller – bass guitar, backing vocals
- Joey Armstrong – drums, percussion, backing vocals

Production

- Zac Carper – production
- Jeff Ellis – mixing
- Igor Druda Imhof – engineer assistant

== Charts ==
Chart (2016)	Peak position
US Heatseekers Albums (Billboard)	15
US Independent Albums (Billboard)	50
