= QuickSilver (project) =

Computer application developed in the 2000s

The QuickSilver project at Cornell University was an AFRL-funded effort in the 2000s to build a platform in support of a new generation of scalable, secure, reliable distributed computing applications that were able to regenerate themselves after failure in order to be more resilient to cyber attacks.

Among the partners on the project were DARPA funding under the SRS program, the United States Air Force (AFOSR), NSF International, Intel Corporation, and others.

The principal investigators were Cornell Professors Kenneth P. Birman, Johannes Gehrke, and Paul Francis
