= Incentive system =

Structure for employee motivation

The term incentive system refers to a variety of fields, including biology, education, and philosophy.

== Organizational Psychology, Economics, and Business ==
In organizational psychology, economics and business an incentive system denotes a structure motivating individuals as part of an organization to act in the interest of the organization.

A fundamental requirement of creating a working incentive system for individuals and the organization is understanding human behavior and motivators of human behavior. Relevant theories helping to understand human behavior include utility theory, principal-agent theory, need hierarchy theory, two factor theory, cognitive evaluation theory, expectancy theory, goal-setting theory, and equity theory. The many determinants influencing human judgment and decision-making highlights the complexity of understanding human behavior. Bonner grouped them into Knowledge and personal involvement, cognitive processes, task variables, and environmental variables, abilities, intrinsic motivation, and other personal variables.

Elements that are part of an incentive system:

- Monetary Compensation (e.g. bonuses, awards, profit-sharing, and incentive plans)
- Non-monetary Compensation (e.g. gifts, company car, company insurance)
- Targets (e.g. easy, difficult, stretch)
- Career Prospects (e.g. promotion, termination of contract)
- Reputational Considerations (e.g. praise, awards, status, wider recognition in society, positive impact of job)
- Meaningfulness of Tasks (job rotation, job enrichment, enlargement)

Important effects induced by an incentive system are: an incentive effect and a sorting effect. Incentive effects are direct effects resulting from the incentive system improving performance. Sorting effects are rather indirect effects. They describe particular incentive systems that attract individuals with particular characteristics. For instance, variable, rather than fixed, compensation tends to attract individuals with higher skill levels and lower control believes (locus of control).
