= State machine (disambiguation) =

State machine is a mathematical model of computation.

It may also refer to:

- Transition system, infinite-state machines
- State machinery, the government structures

== See also ==
- State machine replication, a fault-tolerance methodology
