= Danny Dolev =

Israeli computer scientist

Daniel (Danny) Dolev
- דני דולב
- Education: Hebrew University of Jerusalem (BSc); Weizmann Institute of Science (MSc, PhD)
- Known for: Public-key cryptography, non-malleable cryptography, consensus in asynchronous distributed systems, atomic broadcasting, high availability, Byzantine fault tolerance, Dolev–Yao model
- Awards: ACM Fellow, Edsger W. Dijkstra Prize in Distributed Computing
- Scientific career
- Fields: Computer science, Cryptography, Distributed computing
- Workplaces: Hebrew University of Jerusalem, IBM Almaden Research Center
- Doctoral advisor: Eli Shamir
- Doctoral students: Hagit Attiya; Idit Keidar; Dahlia Malkhi; Michal Parnas; Nir Shavit

Daniel (Danny) Dolev (Hebrew: דני דולב) is an Israeli computer scientist known for his research in cryptography and distributed computing. He holds the Berthold Badler Chair in Computer Science at the Hebrew University of Jerusalem and is a member of the scientific council of the European Research Council.

== Biography ==
Dolev did his undergraduate studies at the Hebrew University, earning a bachelor's degree in 1971. He then moved to the Weizmann Institute of Science, earning a master's degree in 1973 and a doctorate in 1979 under the supervision of Eli Shamir. After postdoctoral research at Stanford University and IBM Research, he joined the Hebrew University faculty in 1982. He took a second position at the IBM Almaden Research Center from 1987 to 1993, but retained his appointment at the Hebrew University. From 1998 to 2002, he was chair of the Institute of Computer Science and then Director of the School of Engineering and Computer Science at the Hebrew University. In 2011, he became the first Israeli on the Scientific Council of the European Research Council.

== Research ==
Dolev has published many highly cited papers, including works on public-key cryptography, non-malleable cryptography, consensus in asynchronous distributed systems, atomic broadcasting, high availability and high-availability clusters, and Byzantine fault tolerance. Dolev–Yao model was co-developed by Danny Dolev and Andrew Yao.

== Awards and honors ==
Dolev was elected as an ACM Fellow in 2007 for his "contributions to fault-tolerant distributed computing". In 2011, Dolev and his co-authors Hagit Attiya and Amotz Bar-Noy were honored with the Edsger W. Dijkstra Prize in Distributed Computing for their work on implementing shared memory using message passing.
