= Jennifer L. Welch =

American computer scientist

Jennifer Lundelius Welch is an American computer scientist known for her work in distributed computing, including methods for leader election and synchronization. She is Regent's Professor emerita at Texas A&M University.

== Education and career ==
Welch was an undergraduate at the University of Texas at Austin, where she graduated summa cum laude with a bachelor's degree in 1979, majoring in liberal arts with a concentration in mathematics. After beginning graduate study in computer science and linguistics at the University of Massachusetts Amherst, stopping out, and working briefly as a computer programmer in Texas, she returned to graduate study at the Massachusetts Institute of Technology. She received a master's degree in 1984, and completed her Ph.D. in 1988. Her doctoral dissertation, Topics in Distributed Computing: The Impact of Partial Synchrony, and Modular Decomposition of Algorithms, was supervised by Nancy Lynch.

During her studies at MIT, she spent a summer working as a member of the technical staff at Bell Labs, and after completing her doctorate, she worked for a year as a researcher at GTE Laboratories. In 1989 she took an assistant professor position at the University of North Carolina at Chapel Hill; she moved to Texas A&M University in 1992. There, she was promoted to associate professor in 1996 and to full professor in 2002. She was named as Halliburton Professor in 1998, as a Chevron Professor in 2004, and as Regent's Professor in 2008. She retired as Regent's Professor emerita in 2022.

== Books ==
Welch joined Hagit Attiya as a coauthor on the second edition of the textbook Distributed Computing: Fundamentals, Simulations, and Advanced Topics (Wiley, 2004). She is a coauthor, with Jennifer E. Walter, of Link Reversal Algorithms (Morgan & Claypool, 2011).

== Recognition ==
Welch was the 2004 recipient of the Harriet B. Rigas Award of the IEEE Education Society and Hewlett Packard. She was named as an ACM Distinguished Scientist in 2012.
