= Hagit Attiya =

Israeli computer scientist

- חגית עטיה
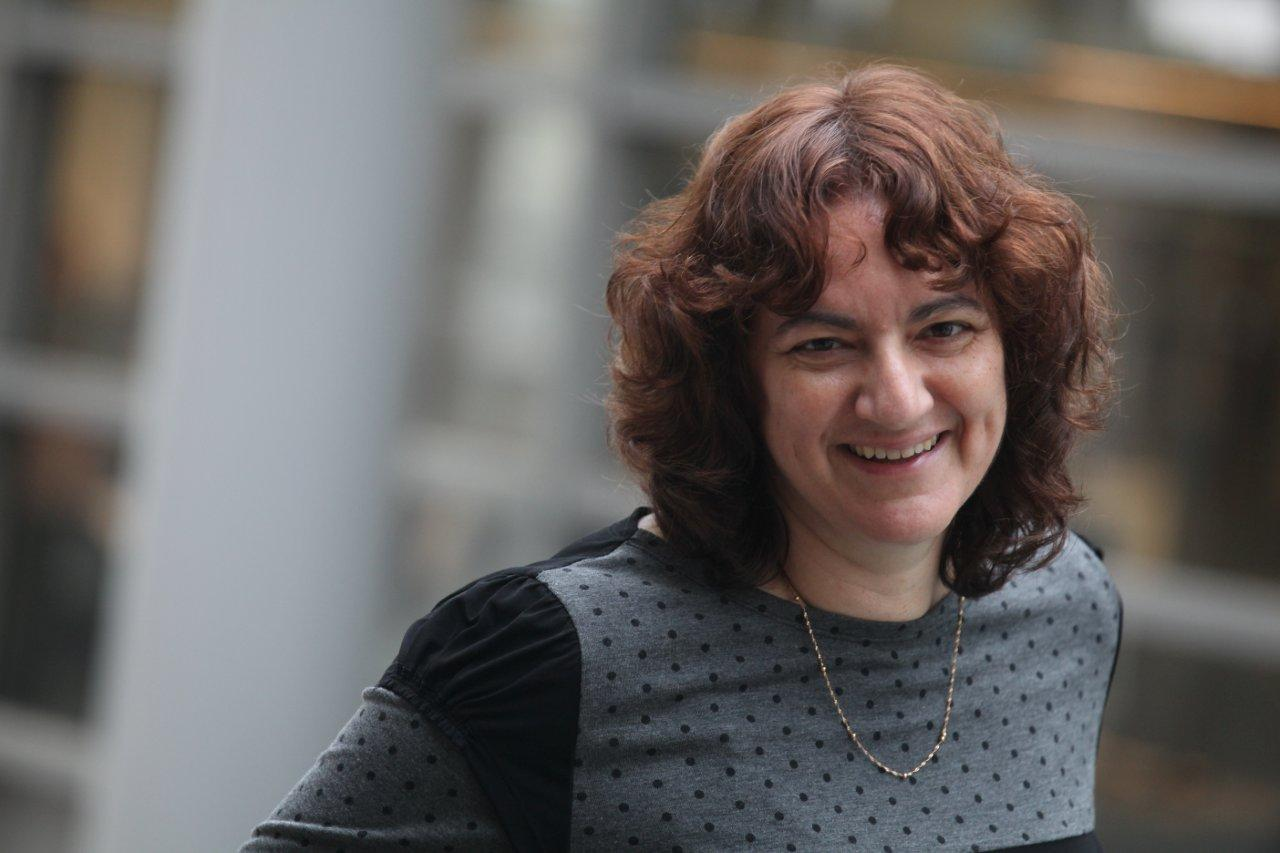
- Education: Hebrew University of Jerusalem (BS, MS, PhD)
- Known for: Research in distributed computing
- Awards: Fellow of the Association for Computing Machinery, Edsger W. Dijkstra Prize in Distributed Computing, Michael Bruno Memorial Award
- Scientific career
- Fields: Computer science, Distributed computing
- Workplaces: Technion – Israel Institute of Technology
- Doctoral advisor: Danny Dolev

Hagit Attiya (Hebrew: חגית עטיה) is an Israeli computer scientist who holds the Harry W. Labov and Charlotte Ullman Labov Academic Chair of Computer Science at the Technion – Israel Institute of Technology in Haifa, Israel. Her research is in the area of distributed computing.

== Education and career ==
Attiya was educated at the Hebrew University of Jerusalem, earning a B.S. in mathematics and computer science in 1981, a master's degree from the same university in 1983, and a doctorate in 1987, under the supervision of Danny Dolev. After postdoctoral studies at the Massachusetts Institute of Technology, she joined the Technion faculty in 1990.

She has been the editor-in-chief of the journal Distributed Computing since 2008.

== Awards and honors ==
Attiya became a fellow of the Association for Computing Machinery in 2009 for "contributions to distributed and parallel computing".

In 2011, Attiya and her co-authors Danny Dolev and Amotz Bar-Noy won the Edsger W. Dijkstra Prize in Distributed Computing for their work on implementing shared memory using message passing, published in the Journal of the ACM in 1995. She was also the recipient of the Michael Bruno Memorial Award from Yad Hanadiv in 2011.

== Selected publications ==
=== Research papers ===
- Attiya, Hagit; Bar-Noy, Amotz; Dolev, Danny; Peleg, David; Reischuk, Rüdiger (July 1990), "Renaming in an Asynchronous Environment", Journal of the ACM, 37 (3): 524–548, doi:10.1145/79147.79158, S2CID 16759044
- Afek, Yehuda; Attiya, Hagit; Dolev, Danny; Gafni, Eli; Merritt, Michael; Shavit, Nir (September 1993), "Atomic Snapshots of Shared Memory" (PDF), Journal of the ACM, 40 (4): 873–890, doi:10.1145/153724.153741, S2CID 52150066
- Attiya, Hagit; Bar-Noy, Amotz; Dolev, Danny (January 1995), "Sharing Memory Robustly in Message-passing Systems" (PDF), Journal of the ACM, 42 (1): 124–142, doi:10.1145/200836.200869, S2CID 52148382

=== Books ===
- Attiya, Hagit; Welch, Jennifer (2004), Distributed Computing: Fundamentals, Simulations, and Advanced Topics (2nd ed.), Hoboken, NJ: Wiley, ISBN 978-0-471-45324-6
- Attiya, Hagit; Ellen, Faith (2014), Impossibility Results for Distributed Computing, Synthesis Lectures on Distributed Computing Theory, San Rafael, CA: Morgan & Claypool, doi:10.2200/S00551ED1V01Y201311DCT012, ISBN 9781627051712, S2CID 20722422
