= Michal Parnas =

Israeli theoretical computer scientist

- מיכל פרנס
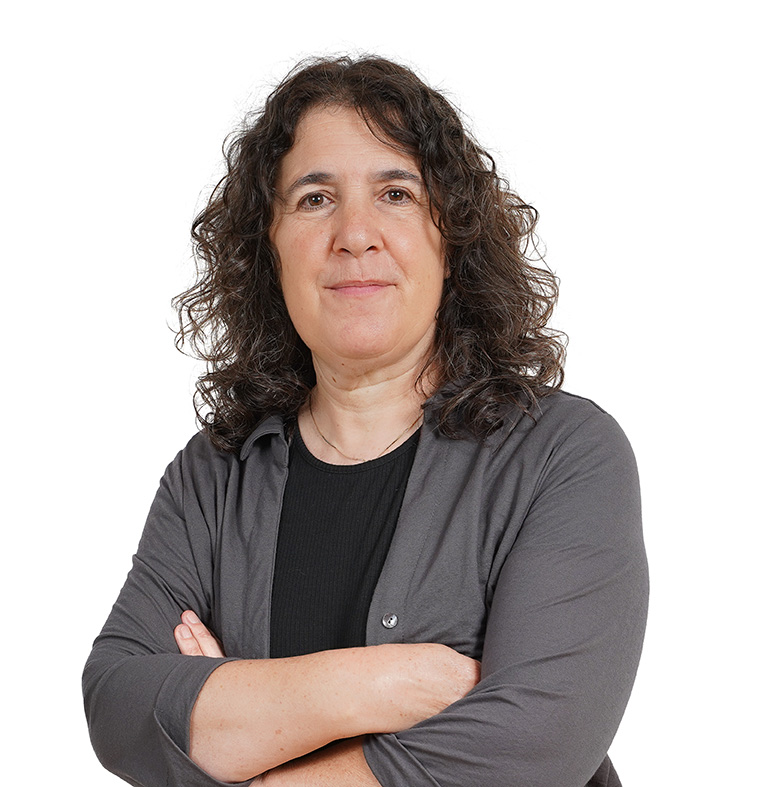
- Education: Hebrew University of Jerusalem
- Known for: Property testing, sublinear-time algorithms
- Scientific career
- Fields: Theoretical Computer Science
- Workplaces: Academic College of Tel Aviv-Yafo
- Doctoral advisor: Danny Dolev, Noam Nisan

Michal Parnas (Hebrew: מיכל פרנס) is an Israeli theoretical computer scientist known for her work on property testing and sublinear-time algorithms. She is a professor of computer science at the Academic College of Tel Aviv-Yafo in Israel, where she was a founding faculty member and was also the dean of the school of computer science from 2011 to 2016. Since October 2022 she is the vice president of academic affairs of the college.

Parnas is the daughter of neurobiologist Itzchak Parnas (1935–2012). She was a master's student at the Hebrew University of Jerusalem, working with Avi Wigderson on a 1990 master's thesis on Approximate Counting, Almost Uniform Generation and Random Walks. She completed her Ph.D. at the Hebrew University in 1994. Her dissertation, Robust Algorithms and Data Structures for Information Retrieval, was jointly supervised by Danny Dolev and Noam Nisan. She is the co-author of a book in Hebrew on discrete mathematics, with Nati Linial.
