= Dahlia Malkhi =

Israeli-American computer scientist

- דליה מלחי
- Education: Hebrew University of Jerusalem
- Awards: ACM Fellow
- Scientific career
- Fields: Computer science
- Doctoral advisor: Danny Dolev

Dahlia Malkhi (Hebrew: דליה מלחי) is an Israeli-American computer scientist, who works on distributed systems and cryptocurrency.

== Education and career ==
Malkhi earned her bachelor's, master's, and doctoral degrees from the Hebrew University of Jerusalem, finishing her Ph.D. under the supervision of Danny Dolev. She taught at the Hebrew University until 2004, and then joined Microsoft Research at their Silicon Valley research center. In 2014, when Microsoft closed the center, she moved to VMware, a company working in cloud computing and platform virtualization.

She became a lead researcher at Novi Financial, a subsidiary of Meta Platforms (Facebook), and the lead maintainer of Meta's Libra cryptocurrency project. Libra later became Diem and Malkhi became chief technology officer at the Diem Association. In 2022, the Diem project shut down, and she moved to Chainlink Labs as their chief research officer. As of 2023, she joined the University of California, Santa Barbara, as a professor of computer science; and remains a chief scientist at Chainlink Labs and an advisor to various industries.

She worked with Chainlink Labs until 2025. In 2024, she became a professor at UCSB's Department of Computer Science, a role she still held in 2026.

== Recognition ==
In 2011, Malkhi became a Fellow of the Association for Computing Machinery "for contributions to fault-tolerant distributed computing." In 2021, she received the Technical Achievement Award of the IEEE Computer Society Technical Committee on Distributed Processing.

== Selected publications ==
- Malkhi, Dahlia; Reiter, Michael (1998), "Byzantine quorum systems", Distributed Computing, 11 (4): 203–213, doi:10.1007/s004460050050, S2CID 812968. Preliminary version in ACM Symposium on Theory of Computing, STOC '97, doi:10.1145/258533.258650.
- Malkhi, Dahlia; Naor, Moni; Ratajczak, David (2002), "Viceroy: A scalable and dynamic emulation of the butterfly", Proceedings of the Twenty-First Annual Symposium on Principles of Distributed Computing (PODC '02), New York, NY, USA: ACM, pp. 183–192, doi:10.1145/571825.571857, ISBN 978-1-58113-485-8, S2CID 825856.
- Malkhi, Dahlia; Nisan, Noam; Pinkas, Benny; Sella, Yaron (2004), "Fairplay – a secure two-party computation system", Proceedings of the 13th USENIX Security Symposium (Sec. '04), Berkeley, CA, USA: USENIX Association.
