= Distributed Computing (journal) =

Computer science journal

- Discipline: Computer science
- Language: English
- Edited by: Hagit Attiya

Publication details
- History: 1986–present
- Publisher: Springer (Germany)
- Frequency: Bimonthly
- Impact factor: 1.674 (2016)

Standard abbreviations
- ISO 4: Distrib. Comput.

Indexing
- ISSN: 0178-2770 (print); 1432-0452 (web)

Links
- Journal homepage; Online access

Distributed Computing is a peer-reviewed scientific journal in the field of computer science, published by Springer. The journal covers the field of distributed computing, with contributions to the theory, specification, design, and implementation of distributed systems.
