= List of Dutch inventions and innovations =

The Dutch have made contributions to art, science, technology and engineering, economics and finance, cartography and geography, exploration and navigation, law and jurisprudence, thought and philosophy, medicine and agriculture. The following list is composed of objects, ideas, phenomena, processes, methods, techniques and styles that were discovered or invented by people from the Netherlands.

== Inventions and innovations ==
=== Arts and architecture ===
==== Rietveld Schröder House (De Stijl architecture) (1924) ====
The Rietveld Schröder House or Schröder House (Rietveld Schröderhuis in Dutch) in Utrecht was built in 1924 by Dutch architect Gerrit Rietveld. It became a listed monument in 1976 and a UNESCO World Heritage Site in 2000. The Rietveld Schröder House constitutes both inside and outside a radical break with tradition, offering little distinction between interior and exterior space. The rectilinear lines and planes flow from outside to inside, with the same colour palette and surfaces. Inside is a dynamic, changeable open zone rather than a static accumulation of rooms. The house is one of the best known examples of De Stijl architecture and arguably the only true De Stijl building.

==== Super Dutch (1990–present) ====
An architectural movement started by a generation of architects during the 1990s, among this generation of architects were OMA, MVRDV, UNStudio, Mecanoo, Meyer en Van Schooten and many more. They started with buildings, which became internationally known for their new style.

==== Furniture ====
===== Dutch door (17th century) =====
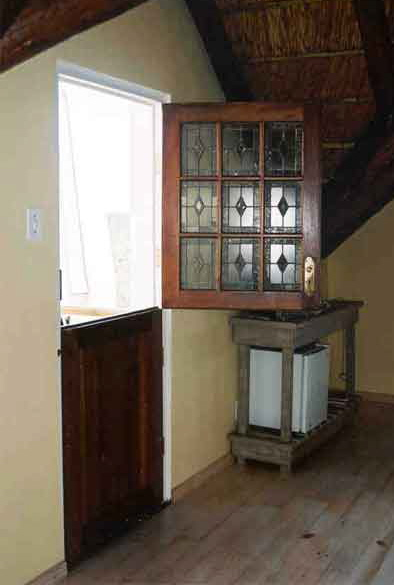
A Dutch door with the top half open, in South Africa

The Dutch door (also known as stable door or half door) is a type of door divided horizontally in such a fashion that the bottom half may remain shut while the top half opens. The initial purpose of this door was to keep animals out of farmhouses, while keeping children inside, yet allowing light and air to filter through the open top. This type of door was common in the Netherlands in the seventeenth century and appears in Dutch paintings of the period. They were commonly found in Dutch areas of New York and New Jersey (before the American Revolution) and in South Africa.

===== Red and Blue Chair (1917) =====
The Red and Blue Chair was designed in 1917 by Gerrit Rietveld. It represents one of the first explorations by the De Stijl art movement in three dimensions. It features several Rietveld joints.

===== Zig-Zag Chair (1934) =====
The Zig-Zag Chair was designed by Rietveld in 1934. It is a minimalist design without legs, made by 4 flat wooden tiles that are merged in a Z-shape using Dovetail joints. It was designed for the Rietveld Schröder House in Utrecht.

==== Visual arts ====
===== Glaze (painting technique) (15th century) =====
Glazing is a technique employed by painters since the invention of modern oil painting. Early Netherlandish painters in the 15th century were the first to make oil the usual painting medium, and explore the use of layers and glazes, followed by the rest of Northern Europe, and only then Italy.

===== Genre painting (15th century) =====
The Flemish Renaissance painter Pieter Brueghel the Elder chose peasants and their activities as the subject of many paintings. Genre painting flourished in Northern Europe in his wake. Adriaen van Ostade, David Teniers, Aelbert Cuyp, Jan Steen, Johannes Vermeer and Pieter de Hooch were among many painters specializing in genre subjects in the Netherlands during the 17th century. The generally small scale of these artists' paintings was appropriate for their display in the homes of middle class purchasers.

===== Marine painting (17th century) =====
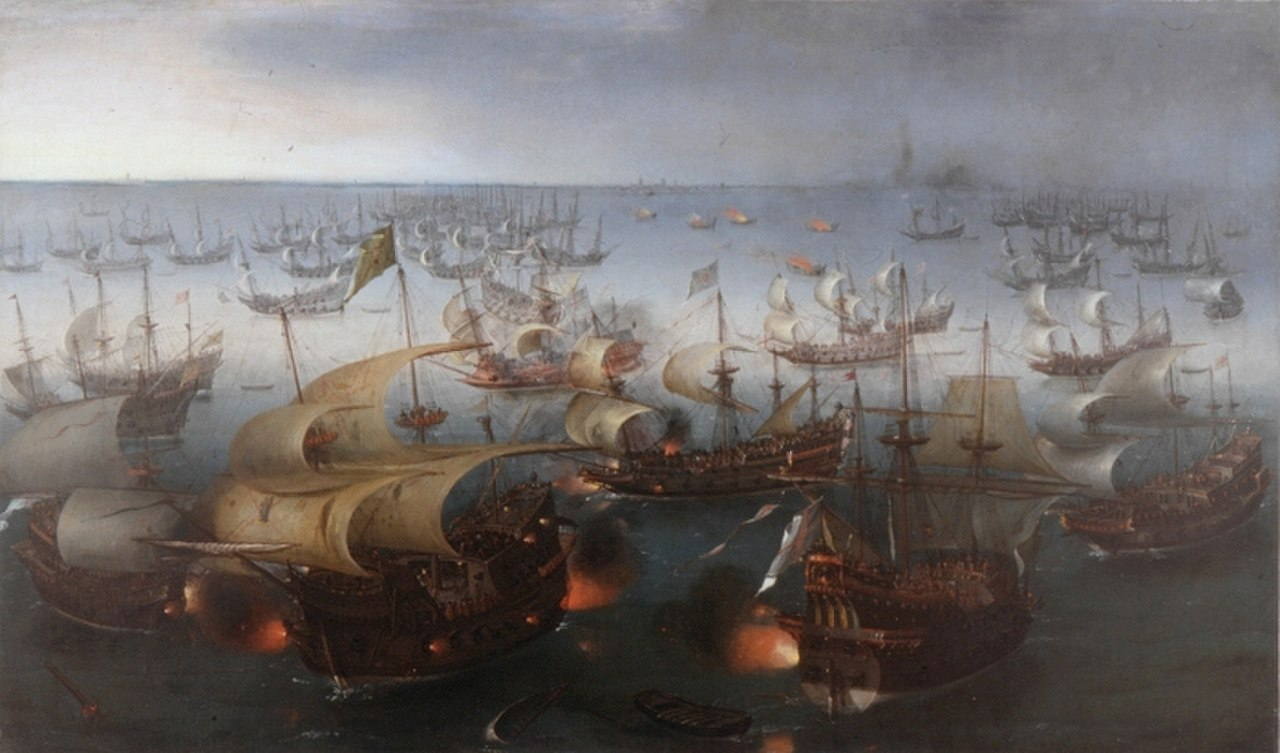
The genre of marine painting as a distinct category separate from landscape is attributed to Hendrick Cornelisz Vroom from early in the seventeenth century.

Marine painting began in keeping with medieval Christian art tradition. Such works portrayed the sea only from a bird's eye view, and everything, even the waves, was organized and symmetrical. The viewpoint, symmetry and overall order of these early paintings underlined the organization of the heavenly cosmos from which the earth was viewed. Later Dutch artists such as Hendrick Cornelisz Vroom, Cornelius Claesz, Abraham Storck, Jan Porcellis, Simon de Vlieger, Willem van de Velde the Elder, Willem van de Velde the Younger and Ludolf Bakhuizen developed new methods for painting, often from a horizontal point of view, with a lower horizon and more focus on realism than symmetry.

===== Vanitas (17th century) =====
The term vanitas is most often associated with still life paintings that were popular in seventeenth-century Dutch art, produced by the artists such as Pieter Claesz. Common vanitas symbols included skulls (a reminder of the certainty of death); rotten fruit (decay); bubbles, (brevity of life and suddenness of death); smoke, watches, and hourglasses, (the brevity of life); and musical instruments (the brevity and ephemeral nature of life). Fruit, flowers and butterflies can be interpreted in the same way, while a peeled lemon, as well as the typical accompanying seafood was, like life, visually attractive but with a bitter flavor

===== Tronie (17th century) =====
Girl with a Pearl Earring (1665), Vermeer's masterpiece is often considered as a "tronie".

In the 17th century, Dutch painters (especially Frans Hals, Rembrandt, Jan Lievens and Johannes Vermeer) began to create uncommissioned paintings called tronies that focused on the features and/or expressions of people who were not intended to be identifiable. They were conceived more for art's sake than to satisfy conventions. The tronie was a distinctive type of painting, combining elements of the portrait, history, and genre painting. This was usually a half-length of a single figure which concentrated on capturing an unusual mood or expression. The actual identity of the model was not supposed to be important, but they might represent a historical figure and be in exotic or historic costume. In contrast to portraits, "tronies" were painted for the open market. They differ from figurative paintings and religious figures in that they are not restricted to a moral or narrative context. It is, rather, much more an exploration of the spectrum of human physiognomy and expression and the reflection of conceptions of character that are intrinsic to psychology's pre-history.

==== Mezzotint (1642) ====
The first known mezzotint was done in Amsterdam in 1642 by Utrecht-born German artist Ludwig von Siegen. He lived in Amsterdam from 1641 to about 1644, when he was supposedly influenced by Rembrandt.

==== Aquatint (1650s) ====
The painter and printmaker Jan van de Velde is often credited to be the inventor of the aquatint technique, in Amsterdam around 1650.

===== Pronkstilleven (1650s) =====
Pronkstilleven (pronk still life or ostentatious still life) is a type of banquet piece whose distinguishing feature is a quality of ostentation and splendor. These still lifes usually depict one or more especially precious objects. Although the term is a post-17th century invention, this type is characteristic of the second half of the seventeenth century. It was developed in the 1640s in Antwerp from where it spread quickly to the Dutch Republic. Flemish artists such as Frans Snyders and Adriaen van Utrecht started to paint still lifes that emphasized abundance by depicting a diversity of objects, fruits, flowers and dead game, often together with living people and animals. The style was soon adopted by artists from the Dutch Republic. A leading Dutch representative was Jan Davidsz. de Heem, who spent a long period of his active career in Antwerp and was one of the founders of the style in Holland. Other leading representatives in the Dutch Republic were Abraham van Beyeren, Willem Claeszoon Heda and Willem Kalf.

===== Miffy (Nijntje) (1955) =====
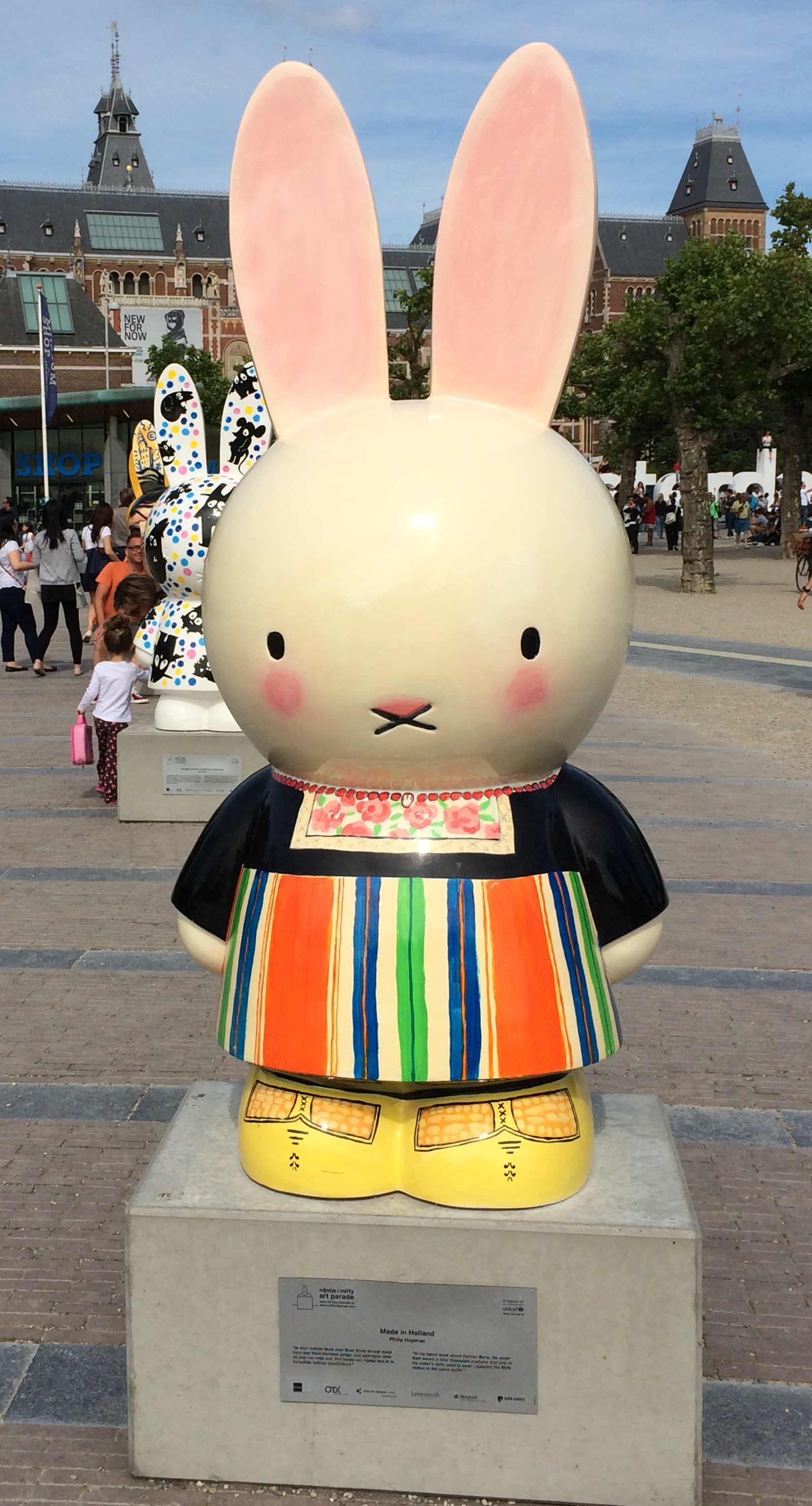
A sculpture of Miffy in Amsterdam

Miffy (Nijntje) is a small female rabbit in a series of picture books drawn and written by Dutch artist Dick Bruna.

==== Music ====
===== Hardcore (electronic dance music genre) (1990s) =====
Hardcore or hardcore techno is a subgenre of electronic dance music originating in Europe from the emergent raves in the 1990s. It was initially designed at Rotterdam in Netherlands, derived from techno.

===== Hardstyle (electronic dance music genre) (1990s–2000s) =====
Hardstyle is an electronic dance genre mixing influences from hardtechno and hardcore. Hardstyle was influenced by gabber. Hardstyle has its origins in the Netherlands where artists like DJ Zany, Lady Dana, DJ Isaac, DJ Pavo, DJ Luna and The Prophet, who produced hardcore, started experimenting while playing their hardcore records.

=== Agriculture ===
==== Orange-coloured carrot (16th century) ====
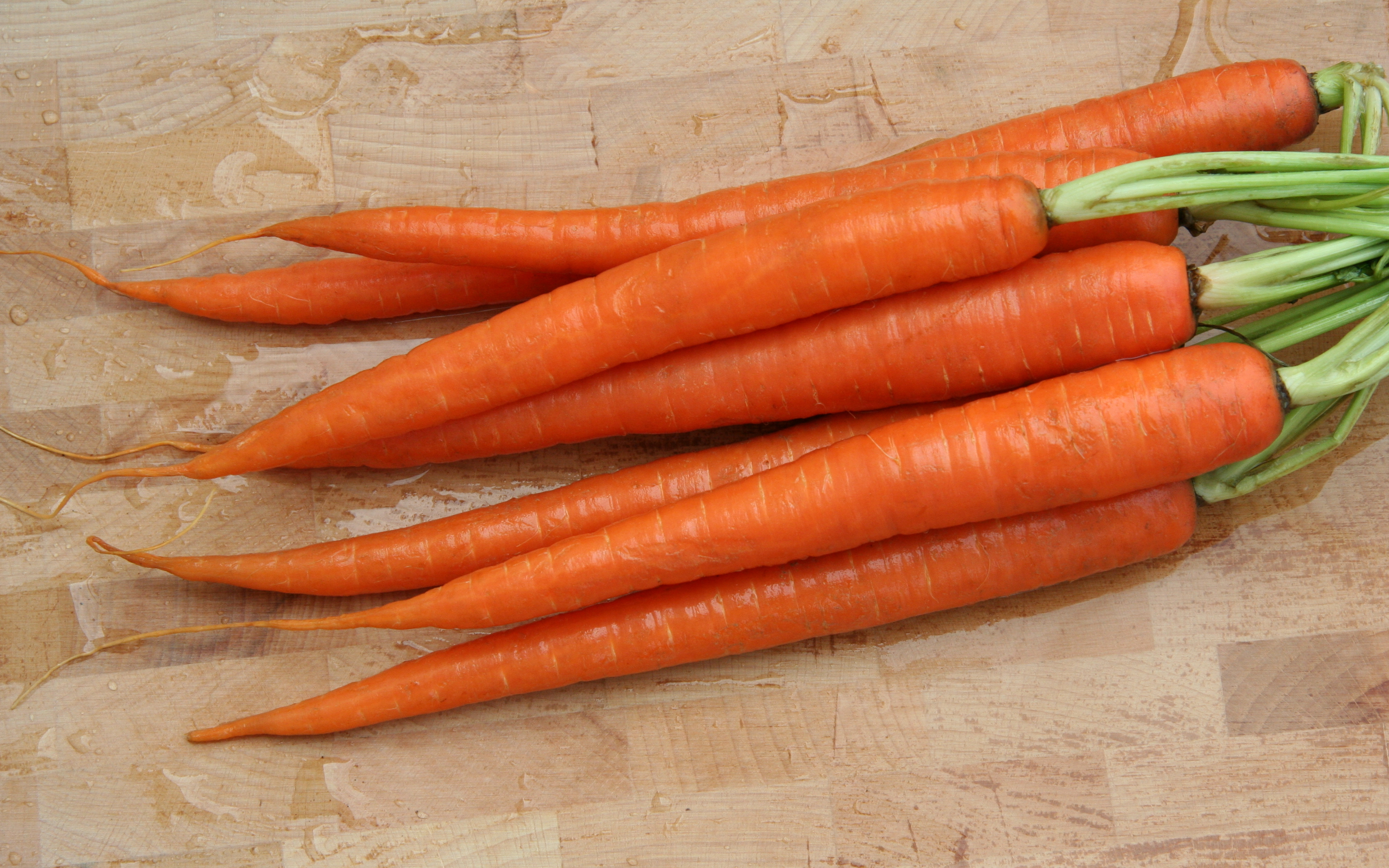
Orange-coloured carrots

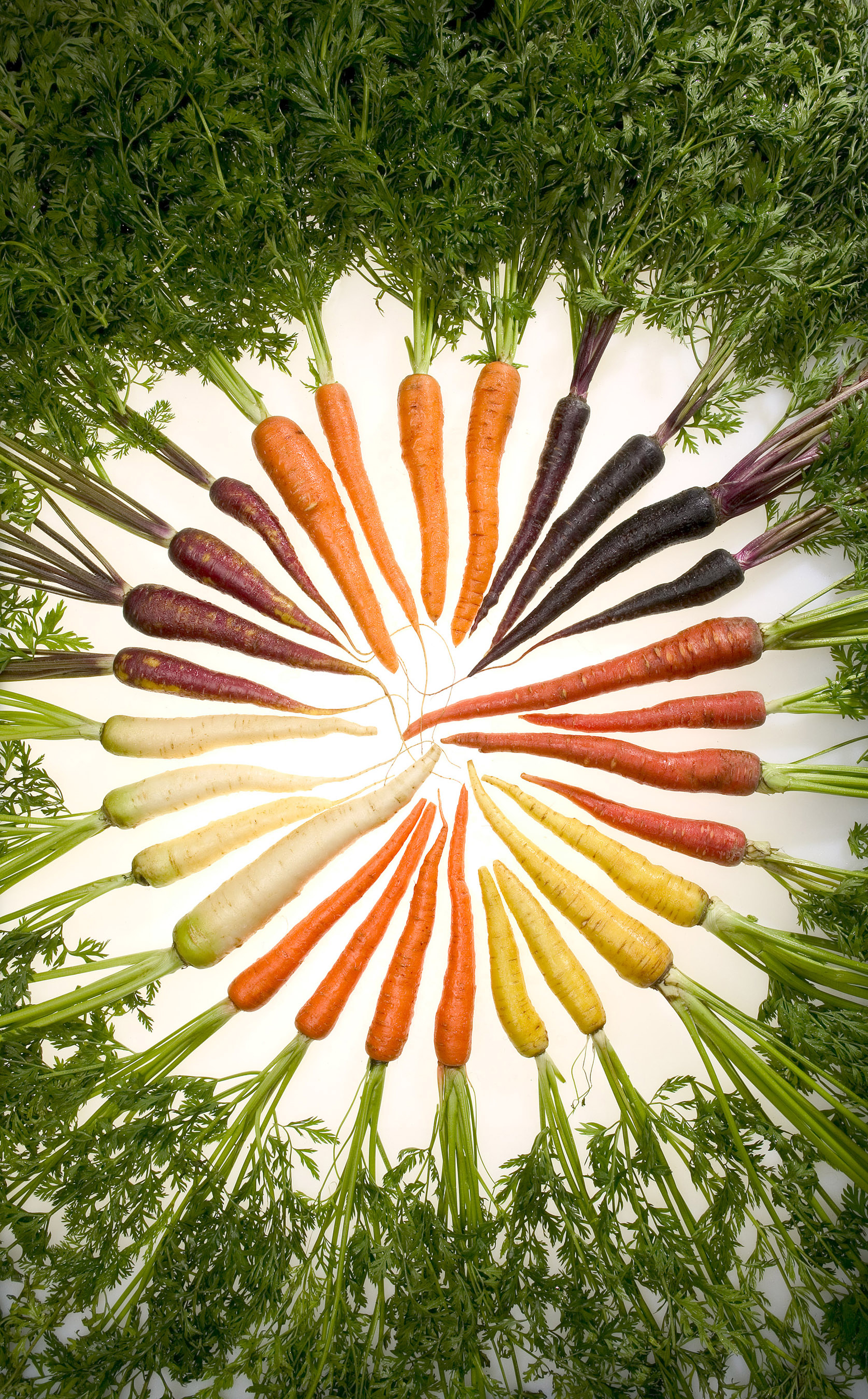
Carrots can be selectively bred to produce different colours.

Through history, carrots were not always orange. They were black, purple, white, brown, red and yellow. Probably orange too, but this was not the dominant colour. Orange-coloured carrots probably first appeared in the Netherlands in the 16th century, bred by farmers in Hoorn. They succeeded by cross-breeding pale yellow with red carrots. It is more likely that Dutch horticulturists actually found an orange rooted mutant variety and then worked on its development through selective breeding to make the plant consistent. Through successive hybridisation the orange colour intensified. This was developed to become the dominant species across the world, a sweet orange.

==== Belle de Boskoop (apple) (1856) ====
The Belle de Boskoop is an apple cultivar which, as its name suggests, originated in Boskoop, where it began as a chance seedling in 1856. There are many variants: Boskoop red, yellow or green. This rustic apple is firm, tart and fragrant. Greenish-gray tinged with red, the apple stands up well to cooking. Generally Boskoop varieties are very high in acid content and can contain more than four times the vitamin C of 'Granny Smith' or 'Golden Delicious'.

==== Karmijn de Sonnaville (apple) (1949) ====
The Karmijn de Sonnaville is a variety of apple bred by Piet de Sonnaville, working in Wageningen in 1949. It is a cross of Cox's Orange Pippin and Jonathan, and was first grown commercially beginning in 1971. It is high both in sugars (including some sucrose) and acidity. It is a triploid, and hence needs good pollination, and can be difficult to grow. It also suffers from fruit russet, which can be severe. In Manhart's book, "apples for the 21st century", Karmijn de Sonnaville is tipped as a possible success for the future. Karmijn de Sonnaville is not widely grown in large quantities, but in Ireland, at The Apple Farm, 8 acres (3.2 ha) it is grown for fresh sale and juice-making, for which the variety is well suited.

==== Elstar (apple) (1950s) ====
The Elstar apple is an apple cultivar that was first developed in the Netherlands in the 1950s by crossing Golden Delicious and Ingrid Marie apples. It quickly became popular, especially in Europe and was first introduced to America in 1972. It remains popular in Continental Europe. The Elstar is a medium-sized apple whose skin is mostly red with yellow showing. The flesh is white, and has a soft, crispy texture. It may be used for cooking and is especially good for making apple sauce. In general, however, it is used in desserts due to its sweet flavour.

=== Cartography and geography ===
==== Triangulation and the systematic use of triangulation networks (1533 and 1615) ====
Triangulation had first emerged as a map-making method in the mid-sixteenth century when the Dutch-Frisian mathematician Gemma Frisius set out the idea in his Libellus de locorum describendorum ratione (Booklet concerning a way of describing places). Dutch cartographer Jacob van Deventer was among the first to make systematic use of triangulation, the technique whose theory was described by Gemma Frisius in his 1533 book.

The modern systematic use of triangulation networks stems from the work of the Dutch mathematician Willebrord Snell (born Willebrord Snel van Royen), who in 1615 surveyed the distance from Alkmaar to Bergen op Zoom, approximately 70 miles (110 kilometres), using a chain of quadrangles containing 33 triangles in all – a feat celebrated in the title of his book Eratosthenes Batavus (The Dutch Eratosthenes), published in 1617.

==== Mercator projection (1569) ====
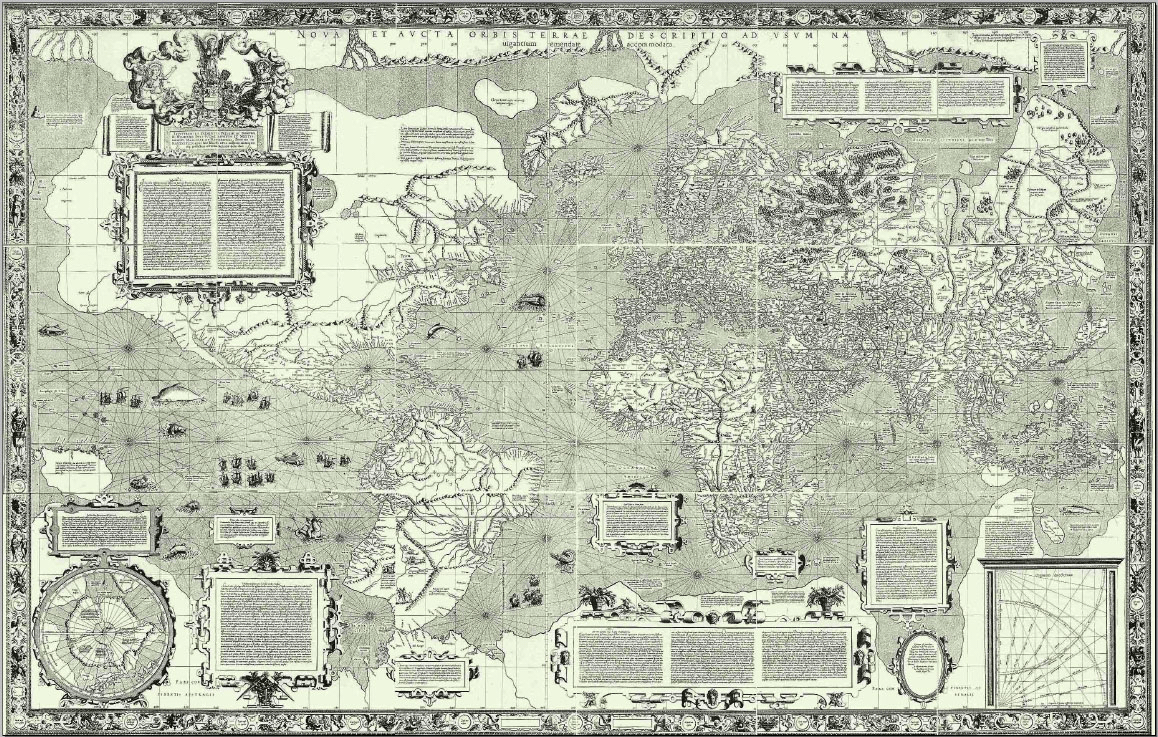
The 1569 Mercator map of the world (Nova et Aucta Orbis Terrae Descriptio ad Usum Navigantium Emendate Accommodata).

The Mercator projection is a cylindrical map projection presented by the Flemish geographer and cartographer Gerardus Mercator in 1569. It became the standard map projection for nautical purposes because of its ability to represent lines of constant course, known as rhumb lines or loxodromes, as straight segments which conserve the angles with the meridians.

==== First modern world atlas (1570) ====
World map Theatrum Orbis Terrarum by Ortelius (1570).

Flemish geographer and cartographer Abraham Ortelius generally recognized as the creator of the world's first modern atlas, the Theatrum Orbis Terrarum (Theatre of the World). Ortelius's Theatrum Orbis Terrarum is considered the first true atlas in the modern sense: a collection of uniform map sheets and sustaining text bound to form a book for which copper printing plates were specifically engraved. It is sometimes referred to as the summary of sixteenth-century cartography.

==== First printed atlas of nautical charts (1584) ====
The first printed atlas of nautical charts (De Spieghel der Zeevaerdt or The Mirror of Navigation / The Mariner's Mirror) was produced by Lucas Janszoon Waghenaer in Leiden. This atlas was the first attempt to systematically codify nautical maps. This chart-book combined an atlas of nautical charts and sailing directions with instructions for navigation on the western and north-western coastal waters of Europe. It was the first of its kind in the history of maritime cartography, and was an immediate success. The English translation of Waghenaer's work was published in 1588 and became so popular that any volume of sea charts soon became known as a "waggoner", the Anglicized form of Waghenaer's surname.

==== Charting of the far southern skies (southern constellations) (1595–97) ====
The constellations around the South Pole were not observable from north of the equator, by Babylonians, Greeks, Chinese or Arabs. The modern constellations in this region were defined during the Age of Exploration, notably by Dutch navigators Pieter Dirkszoon Keyser and Frederick de Houtman at the end of sixteenth century. These twelve Dutch-created southern constellations represented flora and fauna of the East Indies and Madagascar. They were depicted by Johann Bayer in his star atlas Uranometria of 1603. Several more were created by Nicolas Louis de Lacaille in his star catalogue, published in 1756. By the end of the Ming dynasty, Xu Guangqi introduced 23 asterisms of the southern sky based on the knowledge of western star charts. These asterisms have since been incorporated into the traditional Chinese star maps. Among the IAU's 88 modern constellations, there are 15 Dutch-created constellations (including Apus, Camelopardalis, Chamaeleon, Columba, Dorado, Grus, Hydrus, Indus, Monoceros, Musca, Pavo, Phoenix, Triangulum Australe, Tucana and Volans).

==== Continental drift hypothesis (1596) ====
The speculation that continents might have 'drifted' was first put forward by Abraham Ortelius in 1596. The concept was independently and more fully developed by Alfred Wegener in 1912. Because Wegener's publications were widely available in German and English and because he adduced geological support for the idea, he is credited by most geologists as the first to recognize the possibility of continental drift. During the 1960s geophysical and geological evidence for seafloor spreading at mid-oceanic ridges established continental drift as the standard theory or continental origin and an ongoing global mechanism.

=== Chemicals and materials ===
==== Dyneema (1979) ====
Dutch chemical company DSM invented and patented the Dyneema in 1979. Dyneema fibres have been in commercial production since 1990 at their plant at Heerlen. These fibers are manufactured by means of a gel-spinning process that combines extreme strength with incredible softness. Dyneema fibres, based on ultra-high-molecular-weight polyethylene (UHMWPE), is used in many applications in markets such as life protection, shipping, fishing, offshore, sailing, medical and textiles.

=== Communication and multimedia ===
==== Compact cassette (1962) ====
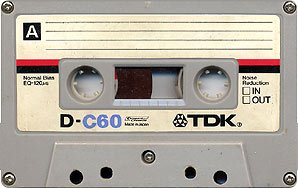
Compact Cassette

In 1962 Philips invented the compact audio cassette medium for audio storage, introducing it in Europe in August 1963 (at the Berlin Radio Show) and in the United States (under the Norelco brand) in November 1964, with the trademark name Compact Cassette.

==== Laserdisc (1969) ====
Laserdisc technology, using a transparent disc, was invented by David Paul Gregg in 1958 (and patented in 1961 and 1990). By 1969, Philips developed a videodisc in reflective mode, which has great advantages over the transparent mode. MCA and Philips decided to join forces. They first publicly demonstrated the videodisc in 1972. Laserdisc entered the market in Atlanta, on 15 December 1978, two years after the VHS VCR and four years before the CD, which is based on Laserdisc technology. Philips produced the players and MCA made the discs.

==== Compact disc (1979) ====
Compact Disc

The compact disc was jointly developed by Philips (Joop Sinjou) and Sony (Toshitada Doi). In the early 1970s, Philips' researchers started experiments with "audio-only" optical discs, and at the end of the 1970s, Philips, Sony, and other companies presented prototypes of digital audio discs.

==== Bluetooth (1990s) ====
Bluetooth, a low-energy, peer-to-peer Wireless technology was originally developed by Dutch electrical engineer Jaap Haartsen and Swedish engineer Sven Mattisson in the 1990s, working at Ericsson in Lund, Sweden. It became a global standard of short distance wireless connection.

==== Wi-fi (1990s) ====
In 1991, NCR Corporation/AT&T Corporation invented the precursor to 802.11 in Nieuwegein. Dutch electrical engineer Vic Hayes chaired IEEE 802.11 committee for 10 years, which was set up in 1990 to establish a wireless networking standard. He has been called the father of Wi-Fi (the brand name for products using IEEE 802.11 standards) for his work on IEEE 802.11 (802.11a & 802.11b) standard in 1997.

==== DVD (1995) ====
The DVD optical disc storage format was invented and developed by Philips and Sony in 1995.

==== Ambilight (2002) ====
Ambilight, short for "ambient lighting", is a lighting system for televisions developed by Philips in 2002.

==== Blu-ray (2006) ====
Philips and Sony in 1997 and 2006 respectively, launched the Blu-ray video recording/playback standard.

=== Computer science and information technology ===
==== Foundations of concurrent programming (1960s) ====
The academic study of concurrent programming started in the 1960s, with Edsger Dijkstra (1965) credited with being the first paper in this field, identifying and solving mutual exclusion. A pioneer in the field of concurrent computing, Per Brinch Hansen considers Dijkstra's Cooperating Sequential Processes (1965) to be the first classic paper in concurrent programming.

==== Mutual exclusion (mutex) (1965) ====
In computer science, mutual exclusion refers to the requirement of ensuring that no two concurrent processes are in their critical section at the same time; it is a basic requirement in concurrency control, to prevent race conditions. The requirement of mutual exclusion was first identified and solved by Edsger W. Dijkstra in his seminal 1965 paper titled Solution of a problem in concurrent programming control, and is credited as the first topic in the study of concurrent algorithms.

==== Semaphore (programming) (1965) ====
The semaphore concept was invented by Dijkstra in 1965 and the concept has found widespread use in a variety of operating systems.

==== Sleeping barber problem (1965) ====
In computer science, the sleeping barber problem is a classic inter-process communication and synchronization problem between multiple operating system processes. The problem is analogous to that of keeping a barber working when there are customers, resting when there are none and doing so in an orderly manner. The sleeping barber problem was introduced by Edsger Dijkstra in 1965.

==== Banker's algorithm (deadlock prevention algorithm) (1965) ====
The Banker's algorithm is a resource allocation and deadlock avoidance algorithm developed by Edsger Dijkstra that tests for safety by simulating the allocation of predetermined maximum possible amounts of all resources, and then makes an "s-state" check to test for possible deadlock conditions for all other pending activities, before deciding whether allocation should be allowed to continue. The algorithm was developed in the design process for the THE multiprogramming system and originally described (in Dutch) in EWD108. The name is by analogy with the way that bankers account for liquidity constraints.

==== Dining philosophers problem (1965) ====
In computer science, the dining philosophers problem is an example problem often used in concurrent algorithm design to illustrate synchronization issues and techniques for resolving them. It was originally formulated in 1965 by Edsger Dijkstra as a student exam exercise, presented in terms of computers competing for access to tape drive peripherals. Soon after, Tony Hoare gave the problem its present formulation.

==== Dekker's algorithm (1965) ====
Dekker's algorithm is the first known correct solution to the mutual exclusion problem in concurrent programming. Dijkstra attributed the solution to Dutch mathematician Theodorus Dekker in his manuscript on cooperating sequential processes. It allows two threads to share a single-use resource without conflict, using only shared memory for communication. It is also the first published software-only, two-process mutual exclusion algorithm.

==== THE multiprogramming system (1968) ====
The THE multiprogramming system was a computer operating system designed by a team led by Edsger W. Dijkstra, described in monographs in 1965–66 and published in 1968.

==== EPROM (1971) ====
An EPROM or erasable programmable read only memory, is a type of memory chip that retains its data when its power supply is switched off. Development of the EPROM memory cell started with investigation of faulty integrated circuits where the gate connections of transistors had broken. Stored charge on these isolated gates changed their properties. The EPROM was invented by the Amsterdam-born Israeli electrical engineer Dov Frohman in 1971, who was awarded US patent 3660819 in 1972.

==== Self-stabilization (1974) ====
Self-stabilization is a concept of fault-tolerance in distributed computing. A distributed system that is self-stabilizing will end up in a correct state no matter what state it is initialized with. That correct state is reached after a finite number of execution steps.

==== Guarded Command Language (1975) ====
The Guarded Command Language (GCL) is a language defined by Edsger Dijkstra for predicate transformer semantics. It combines programming concepts in a compact way, before the program is written in some practical programming language.

==== Van Emde Boas tree (VEB tree) (1975) ====
A Van Emde Boas tree (or Van Emde Boas priority queue, also known as a vEB tree, is a tree data structure which implements an associative array with m-bit integer keys. The vEB tree was invented by a team led by Dutch computer scientist Peter van Emde Boas in 1975.

==== ABC (programming language) (1980s) ====
ABC is an imperative general-purpose programming language and programming environment developed at CWI, Netherlands by Leo Geurts, Lambert Meertens, and Steven Pemberton. It is interactive, structured, high-level, and intended to be used instead of BASIC, Pascal, or AWK. It is not meant to be a systems-programming language but is intended for teaching or prototyping.

The language had a major influence on the design of the Python programming language (as a counterexample); Guido van Rossum, who developed Python, previously worked for several years on the ABC system in the early 1980s.

==== Dijkstra-Scholten algorithm (1980) ====
The Dijkstra–Scholten algorithm (named after Edsger W. Dijkstra and Carel S. Scholten) is an algorithm for detecting termination in a distributed system. The algorithm was proposed by Dijkstra and Scholten in 1980.

==== Smoothsort (1981) ====
Smoothsort is a comparison-based sorting algorithm. It is a variation of heapsort developed by Edsger Dijkstra in 1981. Like heapsort, smoothsort's upper bound is O(n log n). The advantage of smoothsort is that it comes closer to O(n) time if the input is already sorted to some degree, whereas heapsort averages O(n log n) regardless of the initial sorted state.

==== Amsterdam Compiler Kit (1983) ====
The Amsterdam Compiler Kit (ACK) is a fast, lightweight and retargetable compiler suite and toolchain developed by Andrew Tanenbaum and Ceriel Jacobs at the Vrije Universiteit in Amsterdam. It is MINIX's native toolchain. The ACK was originally closed-source software (that allowed binaries to be distributed for MINIX as a special case), but in April 2003 it was released under an open-source BSD license. It has frontends for programming languages C, Pascal, Modula-2, Occam, and BASIC. The ACK's notability stems from the fact that in the early 1980s it was one of the first portable compilation systems designed to support multiple source languages and target platforms.

==== Eight-to-fourteen modulation (1985) ====
EFM (Eight-to-Fourteen Modulation) was invented by Dutch electrical engineer Kees A. Schouhamer Immink in 1985. EFM is a data encoding technique – formally, a channel code – used by CDs, laserdiscs and pre-Hi-MD MiniDiscs.

==== MINIX (1987) ====
MINIX (from "mini-Unix") is a Unix-like computer operating system based on a microkernel architecture. Early versions of MINIX were created by Andrew S. Tanenbaum for educational purposes. Starting with MINIX 3, the primary aim of development shifted from education to the creation of a highly reliable and self-healing microkernel OS. MINIX is now developed as open-source software. MINIX was first released in 1987, with its complete source code made available to universities for study in courses and research. It has been free and open-source software since it was re-licensed under the BSD license in April 2000. Tanenbaum created MINIX at the Vrije Universiteit in Amsterdam to exemplify the principles conveyed in his textbook, Operating Systems: Design and Implementation (1987), that Linus Torvalds described as "the book that launched me to new heights".

==== Amoeba (operating system) (1989) ====
Amoeba is a distributed operating system developed by Andrew S. Tanenbaum and others at the Vrije Universiteit in Amsterdam. The aim of the Amoeba project was to build a timesharing system that makes an entire network of computers appear to the user as a single machine. The Python programming language was originally developed for this platform.

==== Python (programming language) (1989) ====
Python is a widely used general-purpose, high-level programming language. Its design philosophy emphasizes code readability, and its syntax allows programmers to express concepts in fewer lines of code than would be possible in languages such as C++ or Java. The language provides constructs intended to enable clear programs on both a small and large scale. Python supports multiple programming paradigms, including object-oriented, imperative and functional programming or procedural styles. It features a dynamic type system and automatic memory management and has a large and comprehensive standard library.

Python was conceived in the late 1980s and its implementation was started in December 1989 by Guido van Rossum at CWI in the Netherlands as a successor to the ABC language (itself inspired by SETL) capable of exception handling and interfacing with the Amoeba operating system. Van Rossum is Python's principal author, and his continuing central role in deciding the direction of Python is reflected in the title given to him by the Python community, benevolent dictator for life (BDFL).

==== Vim (text editor) (1991) ====
Vim is a text editor written by the Dutch free software programmer Bram Moolenaar and first released publicly in 1991. Based on the Vi editor common to Unix-like systems, Vim carefully separated the user interface from editing functions. This allowed it to be used both from a command line interface and as a standalone application in a graphical user interface.

==== Blender (1995) ====
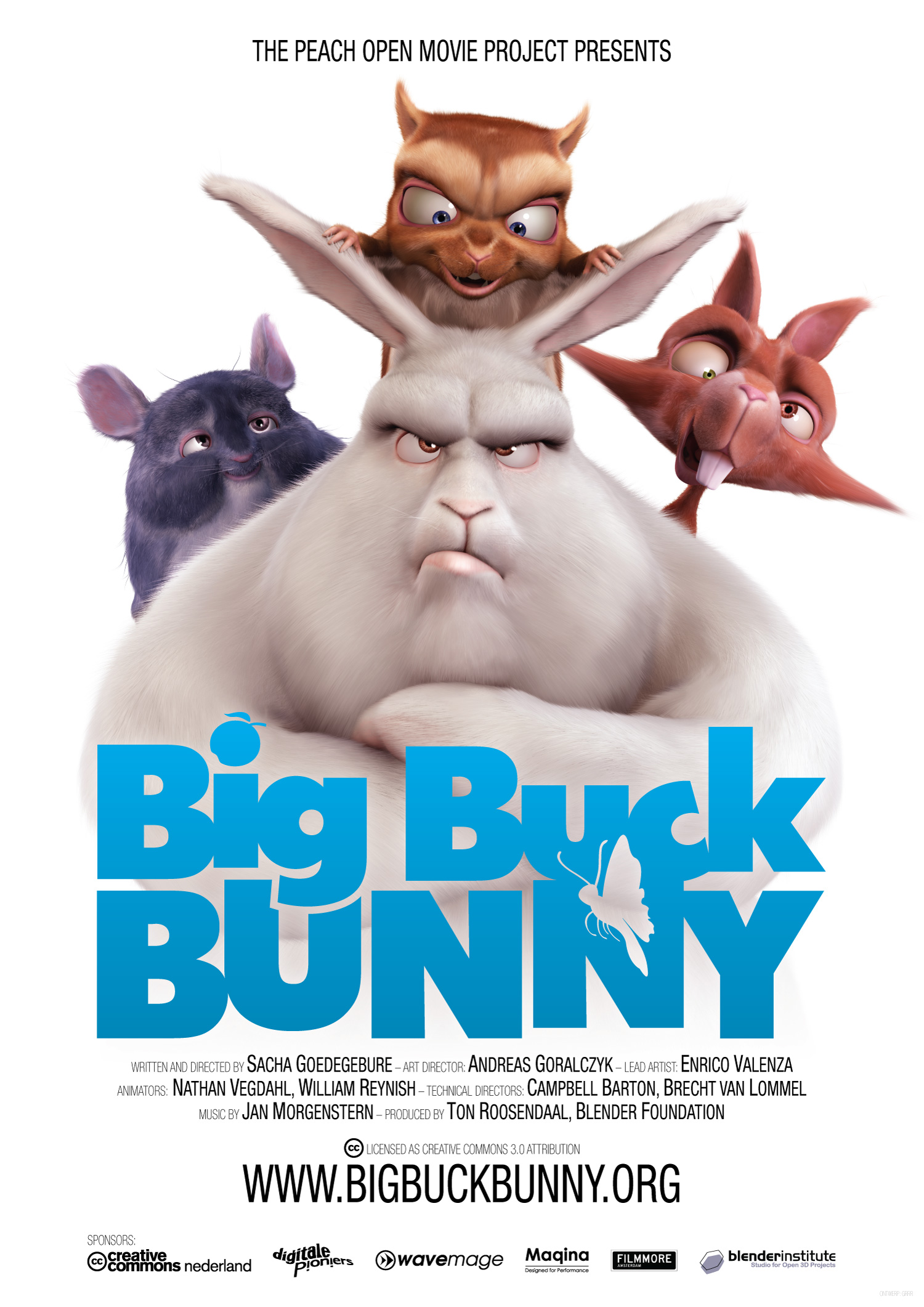
Big Buck Bunny, a short computer animated comedy film by the Blender Institute, part of the Blender Foundation. Like the foundation's previous film Elephants Dream, the film was made using Blender.

Blender is a professional free and open-source 3D computer graphics software product used for creating animated films, visual effects, art, 3D printed models, interactive 3D applications and video games. Blender's features include 3D modeling, UV unwrapping, texturing, raster graphics editing, rigging and skinning, fluid and smoke simulation, particle simulation, soft body simulation, digital sculpting, computer animation, match moving, camera tracking, rendering, video editing and compositing. Alongside the modelling features it also has an integrated game engine. Blender has been successfully used in the media industry in several parts of the world including Argentina, Australia, Belgium, Brazil, Russia, Sweden, and the United States.

The Dutch animation studio Neo Geo and Not a Number Technologies (NaN) developed Blender as an in-house application, with the primary author being Ton Roosendaal. The name Blender was inspired by a song by Yello, from the album Baby.

==== EFMPlus (1995) ====
EFMPlus is the channel code used in DVDs and SACDs, a more efficient successor to EFM used in CDs. It was created by Dutch electrical engineer Kees A. Schouhamer Immink, who also designed EFM. It is 6% less efficient than Toshiba's SD code, which resulted in a capacity of 4.7 gigabytes instead of SD's original 5 GB. The advantage of EFMPlus is its superior resilience against disc damage such as scratches and fingerprints.

=== Economics ===
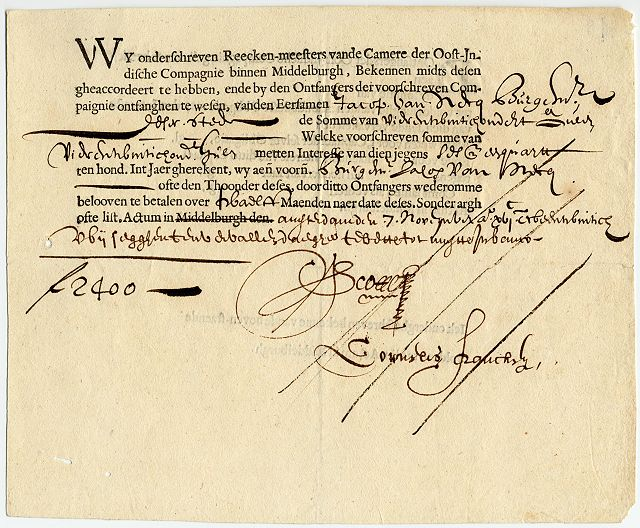
A bond from the Dutch East India Company (VOC), dating from 7 November 1623.

==== Shareholder activism (17th century) ====
In 1609, Isaac Le Maire filed a petition against the VOC, marking the first recorded expression of shareholder activism. Le Maire formally charged that the directors (the VOC's board of directors – the Heeren XVII) sought to "retain another's money for longer or use it ways other than the latter wishes" and petitioned for the liquidation of the VOC in accordance with standard business practice.

The first shareholder revolt happened in 1622, among VOC investors who complained that the company account books had been "smeared with bacon" so that they might be "eaten by dogs." The investors demanded a "reeckeninge," a proper financial audit.

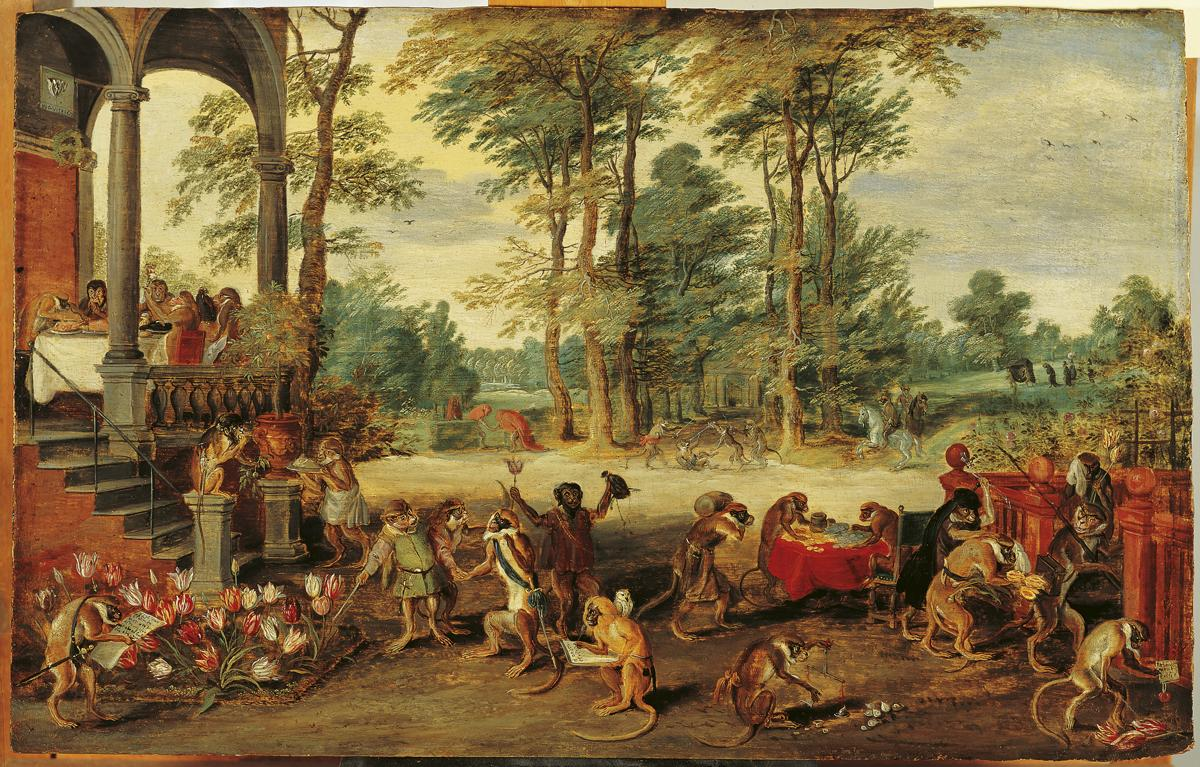
A Satire of Tulip Mania by Jan Brueghel the Younger (ca. 1640) depicts speculators as brainless monkeys in contemporary upper-class dress.

==== First modern economic miracle (1585–1714) ====
The Dutch economic transition from a possession of the Holy Roman Empire in the 1590s to the foremost maritime and economic power in the world has been called the "Dutch Miracle" (or "Dutch Tiger") by some economic historians, including K. W. Swart. During their Golden Age, the provinces of the Northern Netherlands rose from almost total obscurity as the poor cousins of the industrious and heavily urbanised southern regions (Southern Netherlands) to become the world leader in economic success. Its manufacturing towns grew so quickly that by the middle of the century the Netherlands had supplanted France as the leading industrial nation of the world.

==== Dynamic macroeconomic model (1936) ====
Dutch economist Jan Tinbergen developed the first national comprehensive macroeconomic model, which he first built for the Netherlands and after World War II later applied to the United States and the United Kingdom.

=== Finance ===
==== Foundations of modern stock market (1602) ====
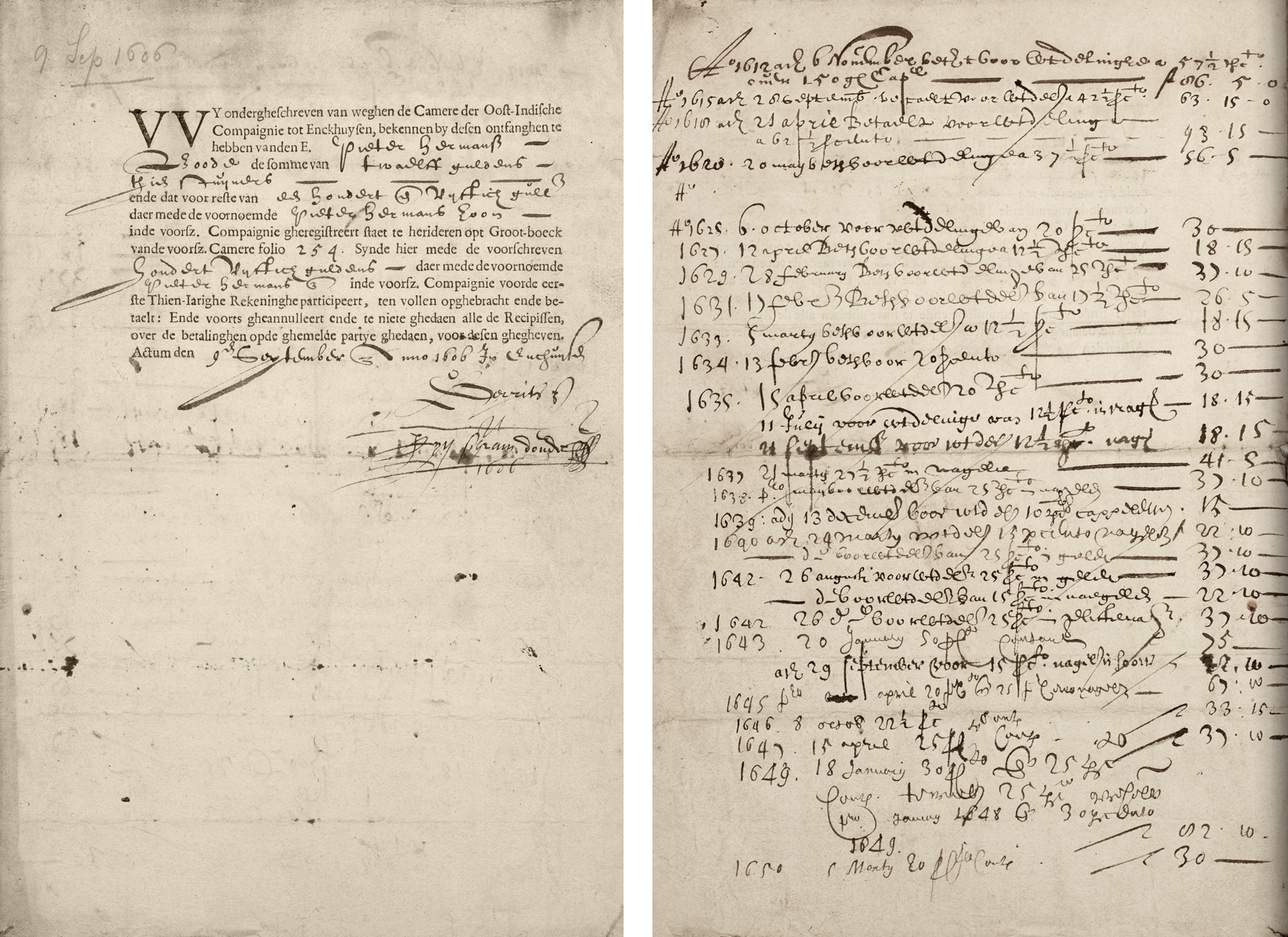
One of the oldest known stock certificates, issued by the VOC chamber of Enkhuizen, dated 9 September 1606.

The seventeenth-century Dutch merchants laid the foundations for modern stock market. The Dutch merchants were also the pioneers in developing the basic techniques of stock trading. Although bond sales by municipalities and states can be traced to the thirteenth century, the origin of modern stock exchanges that specialize in creating and sustaining secondary markets in corporate securities goes back to the formation of the Dutch East India Company in the year 1602.

==== First book on stock trading (1688) ====
Joseph de la Vega, also known as Joseph Penso de la Vega, was an Amsterdam trader from a Spanish Jewish family and a prolific writer as well as a successful businessman. His 1688 book Confusion de Confusiones (Confusion of Confusions) explained the workings of the city's stock market. It was the earliest book about stock trading, taking the form of a dialogue between a merchant, a shareholder and a philosopher. The book described a market that was sophisticated but also prone to excesses, and de la Vega offered advice to his readers on such topics as the unpredictability of market shifts and the importance of patience in investment.

==== Concept of behavioral finance (1688) ====
Joseph de la Vega was in 1688 the first person to give an account of irrational behaviour in financial markets. His 1688 book Confusion of Confusions, has been described as the first precursor of modern behavioural finance, with its descriptions of investor decision-making still reflected in the way some investors operate today.

==== Mutual fund (1774) ====
The first mutual funds were established in 1774 in the Netherlands. Amsterdam-based businessman Adriaan van Ketwich is often credited as the originator of the world's first mutual fund. The first mutual fund outside the Netherlands was the Foreign & Colonial Government Trust, which was established in London in 1868.

=== Foods and drinks ===
==== Gibbing (14th century) ====
Gibbing is the process of preparing salt herring (or soused herring), in which the gills and part of the gullet are removed from the fish, eliminating any bitter taste. The liver and pancreas are left in the fish during the salt-curing process because they release enzymes essential for flavor. The fish is then cured in a barrel with one part salt to 20 herring. Today many variations and local preferences exist on this process. The process of gibbing was invented by Willem Beuckelszoon (aka Willem Beuckelsz, William Buckels or William Buckelsson), a 14th-century Zealand Fisherman. The invention of this fish preservation technique led to the Dutch becoming a seafaring power. This invention created an export industry for salt herring that was monopolized by the Dutch.

==== Gin (jenever) (1650) ====
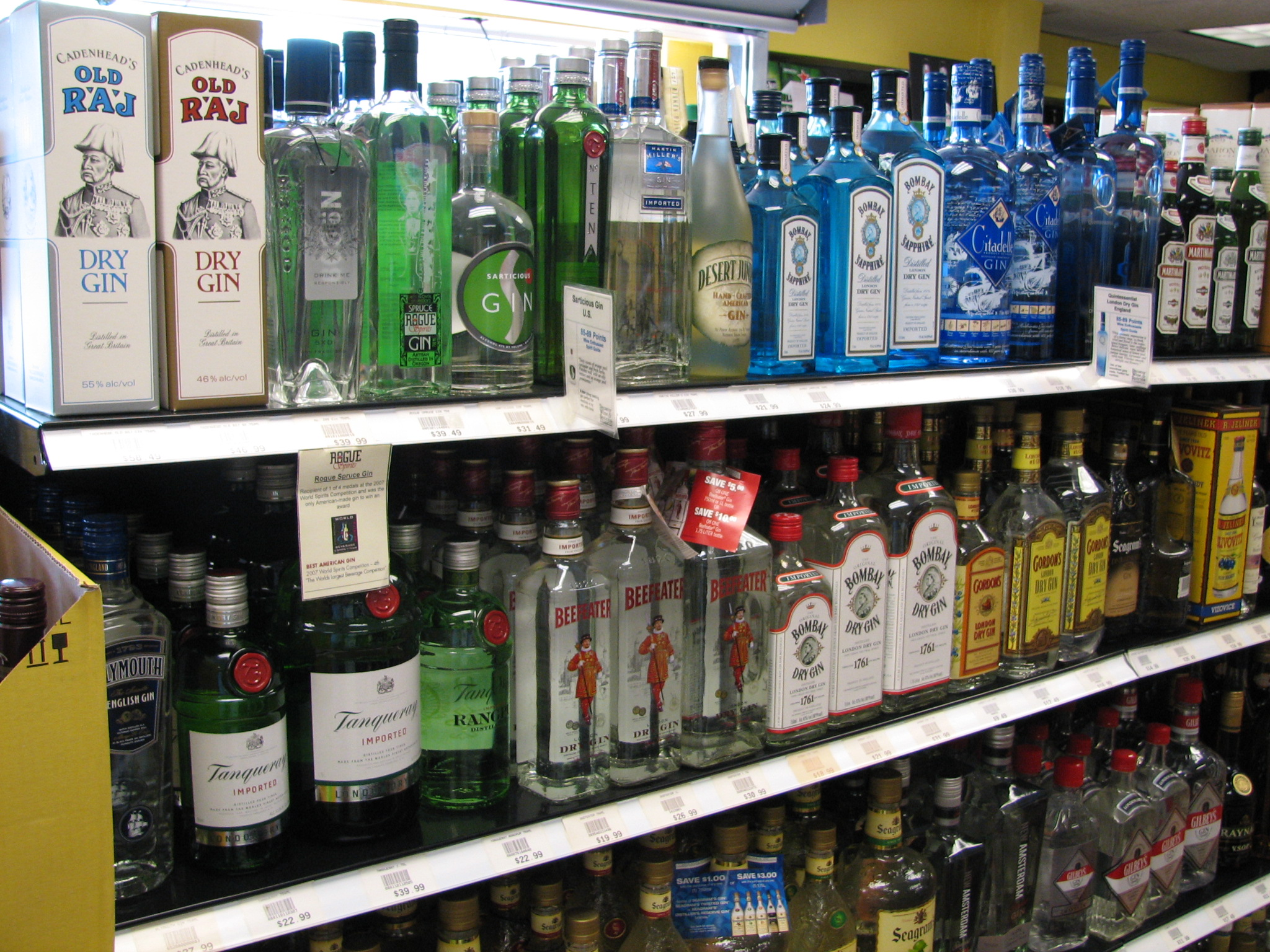
A selection of bottled gins offered at a liquor store.

Gin is a spirit which derives its predominant flavour from juniper berries (Juniperus communis). From its earliest origins in the Middle Ages, gin has evolved over the course of a millennium from a herbal medicine to an object of commerce in the spirits industry. Gin was developed on the basis of the older Jenever, and become widely popular in Great Britain when William III of Orange, leader of the Dutch Republic, occupied the British throne with his wife Mary. Today, the gin category is one of the most popular and widely distributed range of spirits, and is represented by products of various origins, styles, and flavour profiles that all revolve around juniper as a common ingredient.

The Dutch physician Franciscus Sylvius is often credited with the invention of gin in the mid-17th century, although the existence of genever is confirmed in Massinger's play The Duke of Milan (1623), when Dr. Sylvius would have been but nine years of age. It is further claimed that British soldiers who provided support in Antwerp against the Spanish in 1585, during the Eighty Years' War, were already drinking genever (jenever) for its calming effects before battle, from which the term Dutch Courage is believed to have originated. The earliest known written reference to genever appears in the 13th century encyclopaedic work Der Naturen Bloeme (Bruges), and the earliest printed genever recipe from 16th century work Een Constelijck Distileerboec (Antwerp).

==== Stroopwafel (1780s) ====
A stroopwafel (also known as syrup waffle, treacle waffle or caramel waffle) is a waffle made from two thin layers of baked batter with a caramel-like syrup filling the middle. They were first made in Gouda in the 1780s. The traditional way to eat the stroopwafel is to place it atop of a drinking vessel with a hot beverage (coffee, tea or chocolate) inside that fits the diameter of the waffle. The heat from the rising steam warms the waffle and slightly softens the inside and makes the waffle soft on one side while still crispy on the other.

==== Cocoa powder (1828) ====
In 1815, Dutch chemist Coenraad van Houten introduced alkaline salts to chocolate, which reduced its bitterness. In the 1820s, Casparus van Houten Sr. patented an inexpensive method for pressing the fat from roasted cocoa beans. He created a press to remove about half the natural fat (cacao butter) from chocolate liquor, which made chocolate both cheaper to produce and more consistent in quality.

=== Law and jurisprudence ===
==== Permanent Court of Arbitration (1899) ====
The Permanent Court of Arbitration (PCA) is an international organization based in The Hague in the Netherlands. The court was established in 1899 as one of the acts of the first Hague Peace Conference, which makes it the oldest global institution for international dispute resolution. Its creation is set out under Articles 20 to 29 of the 1899 Hague Convention for the pacific settlement of international disputes, which was a result of the first Hague Peace Conference. The most concrete achievement of the Conference was the establishment of the PCA as the first institutionalized global mechanism for the settlement of disputes between states. The PCA encourages the resolution of disputes that involve states, state entities, intergovernmental organizations, and private parties by assisting in the establishment of arbitration tribunals and facilitating their work. The court offers a wide range of services for the resolution of international disputes which the parties concerned have expressly agreed to submit for resolution under its auspices. Dutch-Jew legal scholar Tobias Asser's role in the creation of the PCA at the first Hague Peace Conference (1899) earned him the Nobel Peace Prize in 1911.

==== Marriage equality (legalization of same-sex marriage) (2001) ====
Denmark was the first state to recognize a legal relationship for same-sex couples, establishing "registered partnerships" very much like marriage in 1989. In 2001, the Netherlands became the first nation in the world to grant same-sex marriages. The first laws enabling same-sex marriage in modern times were enacted during the first decade of the 21st century. As of 29 March 2014, sixteen countries (Argentina, Belgium, Brazil, Canada, Denmark, (Note: Excluding the Faroe Islands and Greenland.) France, Iceland, Netherlands, (Note: Excluding Aruba, Curaçao and St Maarten.) New Zealand, (Note: Excluding Tokelau, Niue and the Cook Islands.) Norway, Portugal, Spain, South Africa, Sweden, United Kingdom, (Note: Excluding Northern Ireland. The Scottish parliament has passed a bill that allows same-sex marriages to take place from October 2014.) Uruguay) and several sub-national jurisdictions (parts of Mexico and the United States) allow same-sex couples to marry. Polls in various countries show that there is rising support for legally recognizing same-sex marriage across race, ethnicity, age, religion, political affiliation, and socioeconomic status.

=== Measurement ===
==== Pendulum clock (1656) ====
The first mechanical clocks, employing the verge escapement mechanism with a foliot or balance wheel timekeeper, were invented in Europe at around the start of the 14th century, and became the standard timekeeping device until the pendulum clock was invented in 1656. The pendulum clock remained the most accurate timekeeper until the 1930s, when quartz oscillators were invented, followed by atomic clocks after World War 2.

A pendulum clock uses a pendulum's arc to mark intervals of time. From their invention until about 1930, the most accurate clocks were pendulum clocks. Pendulum clocks cannot operate on vehicles or ships at sea, because the accelerations disrupt the pendulum's motion, causing inaccuracies. The pendulum clock was invented by Christiaan Huygens, based on the pendulum introduced by Galileo Galilei. Although Galileo studied the pendulum as early as 1582, he never actually constructed a clock based on that design. Christiaan Huygens invented pendulum clock in 1656 and patented it the following year. He contracted the construction of his clock designs to clockmaker Salomon Coster, who actually built the clock.

==== Concept of the standardization of the temperature scale (1665) ====
Various authors have credited the invention of the thermometer to Cornelis Drebbel, Robert Fludd, Galileo Galilei or Santorio Santorio. The thermometer was not a single invention, however, but a development. Though Galileo is often said to be the inventor of the thermometer, what he produced were thermoscopes. The difference between a thermoscope and a thermometer is that the latter has a scale. The first person to put a scale on a thermoscope is variously said to be the Venetian Francesco Sagredo or his fellow Venetian Santorio Santorio in about 1611 to 1613. However, each inventor and each thermometer was unique – there was no standard scale. In 1665, Christiaan Huygens suggested using the melting and boiling points of water as standards, and in 1694 Italian Carlo Rinaldini proposed using them as fixed points on a universal scale. In 1701 Isaac Newton proposed a scale of 12 degrees between the melting point of ice and body temperature. The Fahrenheit scale is now usually defined by two fixed points: the temperature at which water freezes into ice is defined as 32 degrees Fahrenheit (°F), and the boiling point of water is defined to be 212 °F (100 °C), a 180-degree separation, as defined at sea level and standard atmospheric pressure. In 1742, Swedish astronomer Anders Celsius created a temperature scale which was the reverse of the scale now known by the name "Celsius": 0 represented the boiling point of water, while 100 represented the freezing point of water. From 1744 until 1954, 0 °C was defined as the freezing point of water and 100 °C was defined as the boiling point of water, both at a pressure of one standard atmosphere with mercury being the working material.

==== Spiral-hairspring watch (1675) ====
The invention of the mainspring in the early 15th century allowed portable clocks to be built, evolving into the first pocketwatches by the 16th century, but these were not very accurate until the balance spring was added to the balance wheel in the mid-17th century. Some dispute remains as to whether British scientist Robert Hooke (his was a straight spring) or Dutch scientist Christiaan Huygens was the actual inventor of the balance spring. This innovation increased watches' accuracy enormously, reducing error from perhaps several hours per day to perhaps 10 minutes per day, resulting in the addition of the minute hand to the face from around 1680 in Britain and 1700 in France.

==== Fahrenheit scale (1724) ====
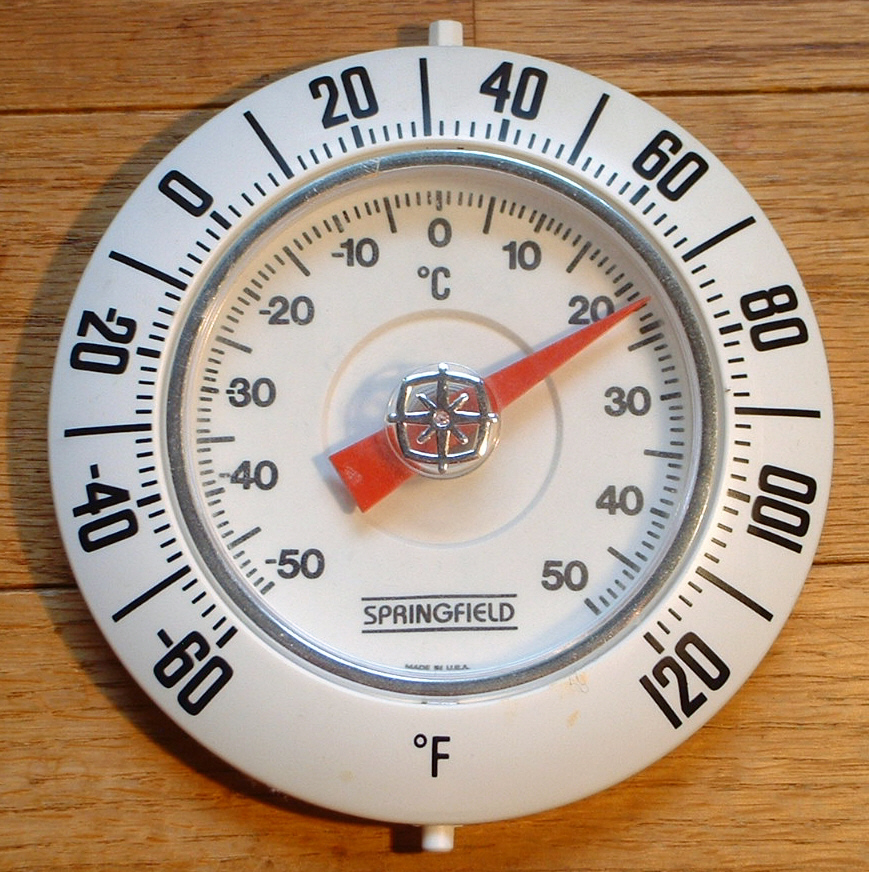
Thermometer with Fahrenheit (symbol °F) and Celsius (symbol °C) units.

In 1724 Daniel Gabriel Fahrenheit produced a temperature scale which now (slightly adjusted) bears his name. He could do this because he manufactured thermometers, using mercury (which has a high coefficient of expansion) for the first time and the quality of his production could provide a finer scale and greater reproducibility, leading to its general adoption. By the end of the 20th century, most countries used the Celsius scale rather than the Fahrenheit scale, though Canada retained it as a supplementary scale used alongside Celsius. Fahrenheit remains the official scale for Jamaica, the Cayman Islands, Belize, the Bahamas, Palau and the United States and associated territories.

==== Snellen chart (1862) ====
The Snellen chart is an eye chart used by eye care professionals and others to measure visual acuity. Snellen charts are named after Dutch ophthalmologist Hermann Snellen who developed the chart in 1862. Vision scientists now use a variation of this chart, designed by Ian Bailey and Jan Lovie.

=== Medicine ===
==== Clinical electrocardiography (1902) ====
In the 19th century it became clear that the heart generated electric currents. The first to systematically approach the heart from an electrical point-of-view was Augustus Waller, working in St Mary's Hospital in Paddington, London. In 1911 he saw little clinical application for his work. The breakthrough came when Willem Einthoven, working in Leiden, used his more sensitive string galvanometer, than the capillary electrometer that Waller used. Einthoven assigned the letters P, Q, R, S and T to the various deflections that it measured and described the electrocardiographic features of a number of cardiovascular disorders. He was awarded the 1924 Nobel Prize for Physiology or Medicine for his discovery.

==== Einthoven's triangle (1902) ====
Einthoven's triangle is an imaginary formation of three limb leads in a triangle used in electrocardiography, formed by the two shoulders and the pubis. The shape forms an inverted equilateral triangle with the heart at the center that produces zero potential when the voltages are summed. It is named after Willem Einthoven, who theorized its existence.

==== Rotating drum dialysis machine (1943) ====
An artificial kidney is a machine and its related devices which clean blood for patients who have an acute or chronic failure of their kidneys. The first artificial kidney was developed by Dutchman Willem Johan Kolff. The procedure of cleaning the blood by this means is called dialysis, a type of renal replacement therapy that is used to provide an artificial replacement for lost kidney function due to renal failure. It is a life support treatment and does not treat disease.

=== Musical instruments ===
==== Metronome (1812) ====
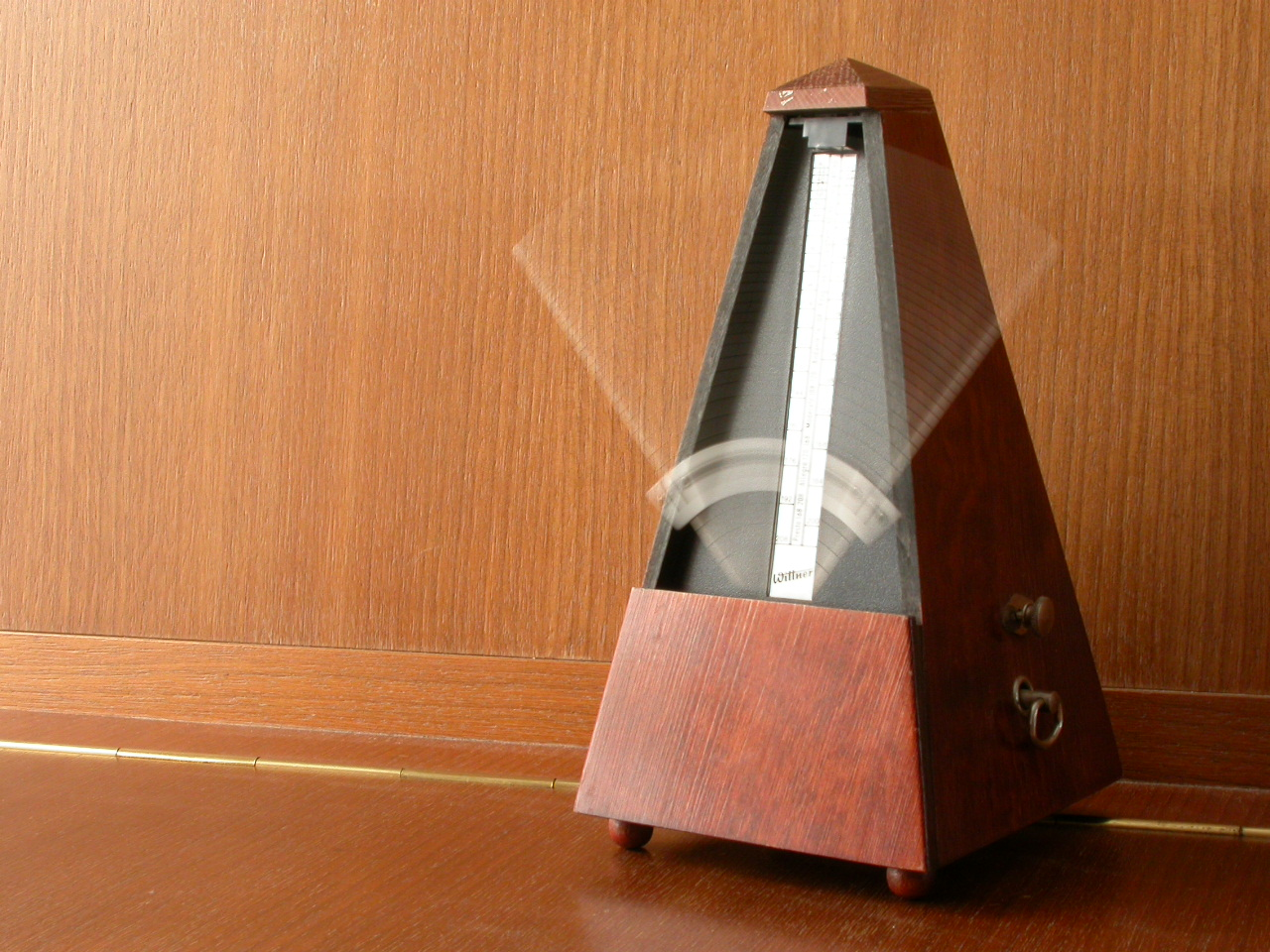
A mechanical wind-up metronome in motion

The first (mechanical) metronome was invented by Dietrich Nikolaus Winkel in Amsterdam in 1812, but named (patented) after Johann Maelzel, who took the idea and popularized it.

==== Fokker organ (1950) ====
Dutch musician-physicist Adriaan Fokker designed and had built keyboard instruments capable of playing microtonal scales via a generalized keyboard. The best-known of these is his 31-tone equal-tempered organ, which was installed in Teylers Museum in Haarlem in 1951. It is commonly called the Fokker organ.

==== Kraakdoos (1960s) ====
The Kraakdoos or Cracklebox is a custom-made battery-powered noise-making electronic device. It is a small box with six metal contacts on top, which when pressed by fingers generates unusual sounds and tones. The human body becomes a part of the circuit and determines the range of sounds possible – different players generate different results. The concept was first conceived by Michel Waisvisz and Geert Hamelberg in the 1960s, and developed further in the 1970s when Waisvisz joined the STEIM foundation in Amsterdam.

==== Moodswinger (2006) ====
The Moodswinger is a twelve-string electric zither with an additional third bridge designed by Dutch luthier Yuri Landman. The rod functions as the third bridge and divides the strings into two sections to add overtones, creating a multiphonic sound.

==== Springtime (guitar) (2008) ====
The Springtime is an experimental electric guitar with seven strings and three outputs. Landman created the instrument in 2008.

=== Philosophy and social sciences ===
==== Neostoicism (1580s) ====
Neostoicism was a syncretic philosophical movement, joining Stoicism and Christianity. Neostoicism was founded by Dutch-Flemish humanist Justus Lipsius, who in 1584 presented its rules, expounded in his book De Constantia (On Constancy), as a dialogue between Lipsius and his friend Charles de Langhe. The eleven years (1579–1590) that Lipsius spent in Leiden (Leiden University) were the period of his greatest productivity. It was during this time that he wrote a series of works designed to revive ancient Stoicism in a form that would be compatible with Christianity. The most famous of these is De Constantia (1584).

=== Religion and ethics ===
The Dutch Reformed Church (in Dutch: Nederlandse Hervormde Kerk or NHK) was a Reformed Christian denomination. It developed during the Protestant Reformation, with its base in the Roman Catholic Church. It was founded in the 1570s and lasted until 2004, the year it merged with the Reformed Churches in the Netherlands and the Evangelical Lutheran Church in the Kingdom of the Netherlands to form the Protestant Church in the Netherlands.

==== Arminianism (1620) ====
Arminianism is based on the theological ideas of Dutch Reformed theologian Jacobus Arminius (1560–1609) and his historic supporters known as the Remonstrants. His teachings held to the five solae of the Reformation, but they were distinct from the particular teachings of Martin Luther, Zwingli, John Calvin, and other Protestant Reformers. Arminius (Jacobus Hermanszoon) was a student of Beza (successor of Calvin) at the Theological University of Geneva.

Many Christian denominations have been influenced by Arminian views on the will of man being freed by grace prior to regeneration, notably the Baptists in the 16th century, the Methodists in the 18th century and the Seventh-day Adventist Church. John Wesley was influenced by Arminianism. Also, Arminianism was an important influence in Methodism, which developed out of the Wesleyan movement. Some assert that Universalists and Unitarians in the 18th and 19th centuries were theologically linked with Arminianism.

==== Jansenism (1640s) ====
Jansenism was a Catholic theological movement, primarily in France, that emphasized original sin, human depravity, the necessity of divine grace, and predestination. The movement originated from the posthumously published work (Augustinus) of the Dutch theologian Cornelius Jansen, who died in 1638. It was first popularized by Jansen's friend Abbot Jean Duvergier de Hauranne, of Saint-Cyran-en-Brenne Abbey, and after Duvergier's death in 1643, was led by Antoine Arnauld. Through the 17th and into the 18th centuries, Jansenism was a distinct movement within the Catholic Church. The theological centre of the movement was the convent of Port-Royal Abbey, Paris, which was a haven for writers including Duvergier, Arnauld, Pierre Nicole, Blaise Pascal, and Jean Racine.

=== Scientific instruments ===
==== Telescope (optical telescope) (1608) ====
The first historical records of a telescope appear in patents filed 1608 by Hans Lippershey and Jacob Metius. A description of Lippershey's instrument quickly reached Galileo Galilei, who created an improved version in 1609, with which he made the observations found in his Sidereus Nuncius of 1610.

==== Huygens eyepiece (1670s) ====
Huygens eyepieces consist of two plano-convex lenses with the plane sides towards the eye separated by an air gap. The lenses are called the eye lens and the field lens. The focal plane is located between the two lenses. It was invented by Christiaan Huygens in the late 1660s and was the first compound (multi-lens) eyepiece. Huygens discovered that two air spaced lenses can be used to make an eyepiece with zero transverse chromatic aberration. These eyepieces work well with the very long focal length telescopes (in Huygens day they were used with single element long focal length non-achromatic refracting telescopes, including very long focal length aerial telescopes). This optical design is now considered obsolete since with today's shorter focal length telescopes the eyepiece suffers from short eye relief, high image distortion, chromatic aberration, and a very narrow apparent field of view. Since these eyepieces are cheap to make they can often be found on inexpensive telescopes and microscopes. Because Huygens eyepieces do not contain cement to hold the lens elements, telescope users sometimes use these eyepieces in the role of "solar projection", i.e. projecting an image of the Sun onto a screen. Other cemented eyepieces can be damaged by the intense, concentrated light of the Sun.

==== Microorganisms (1670s) ====
Using an improved simple microscope, in 1673 Antonie van Leeuwenhoek becomes the first to discover, observe, describe, study and conduct scientific experiments with single-celled organisms, which he originally referred to as animalcules, and which now referred to as micro-organisms or microbes. For these observations he created at least 25 simple microscopes, of differing types, of which only nine survive. His simple microscopes were made of silver or copper frames, holding specially shaped single glass sphere that acted as a small lens. The smaller the sphere, the more it magnified. Those that have survived are capable of magnification up to 275 times. It is suspected that Van Leeuwenhoek possessed units that could magnify up to 500 times.

==== Cycloidal pendulum (1673) ====
The cycloid pendulum was invented by Christiaan Huygens in 1673. Its purpose is to eliminate the lack of isochronism of the ordinary simple pendulum. This is achieved by making the mass point move on a cycloid instead of a circular arc.

==== Pyrometer (1739) ====
The pyrometer, invented by Pieter van Musschenbroek, is a temperature measuring device. A simple type uses a thermocouple placed either in a furnace or on the item to be measured. The voltage output of the thermocouple is read from a meter. Many different types of thermocouple are available, for measuring temperatures from −200 °C to above 1500 °C.

==== Leyden jar (1745–1746) ====
A Leyden jar, or Leiden jar, is a device that "stores" static electricity between two electrodes on the inside and outside of a glass jar. It was the original form of a capacitor (originally known as a "condenser"). It was invented independently by German cleric Ewald Georg von Kleist on 11 October 1745 and by Dutch scientist Pieter van Musschenbroek of Leiden (Leyden) in 1745–1746. The invention was named for the city. The Leyden jar was used to conduct many early experiments in electricity, and its discovery was of fundamental importance in the study of electricity. Previously, researchers had to resort to insulated conductors of large dimensions to store a charge. The Leyden jar provided a much more compact alternative. Like many early electrical devices, there was no particular use for the Leyden jar at first, other than to allow scientists to do a greater variety of electrical experiments.

These scientists developed the Leyden jar while working under a theory of electricity that saw electricity as a fluid, and hoped to develop the jar to "capture" this fluid. In 1744 von Kleist lined a glass jar with silver foil, and charged the foil with a friction machine. Kleist was convinced that a substantial electric charge could be collected when he received a significant shock from the device. The effects of this "Kleistian jar" were independently discovered around the same time by Dutch scientists Pieter van Musschenbroek and Cunaeus at the University of Leiden. Van Musschenbroek communicated on it with the French scientific community where it was called the Leyden jar.

==== Kipp's apparatus (1860) ====
Kipp's apparatus, also called a Kipp generator, is designed for preparation of small volumes of gases. It was invented around 1860 by Dutch pharmacist Petrus Jacobus Kipp and widely used in chemical laboratories and for demonstrations in schools into the second half of the 20th century.

==== Phase contrast microscope (1933) ====
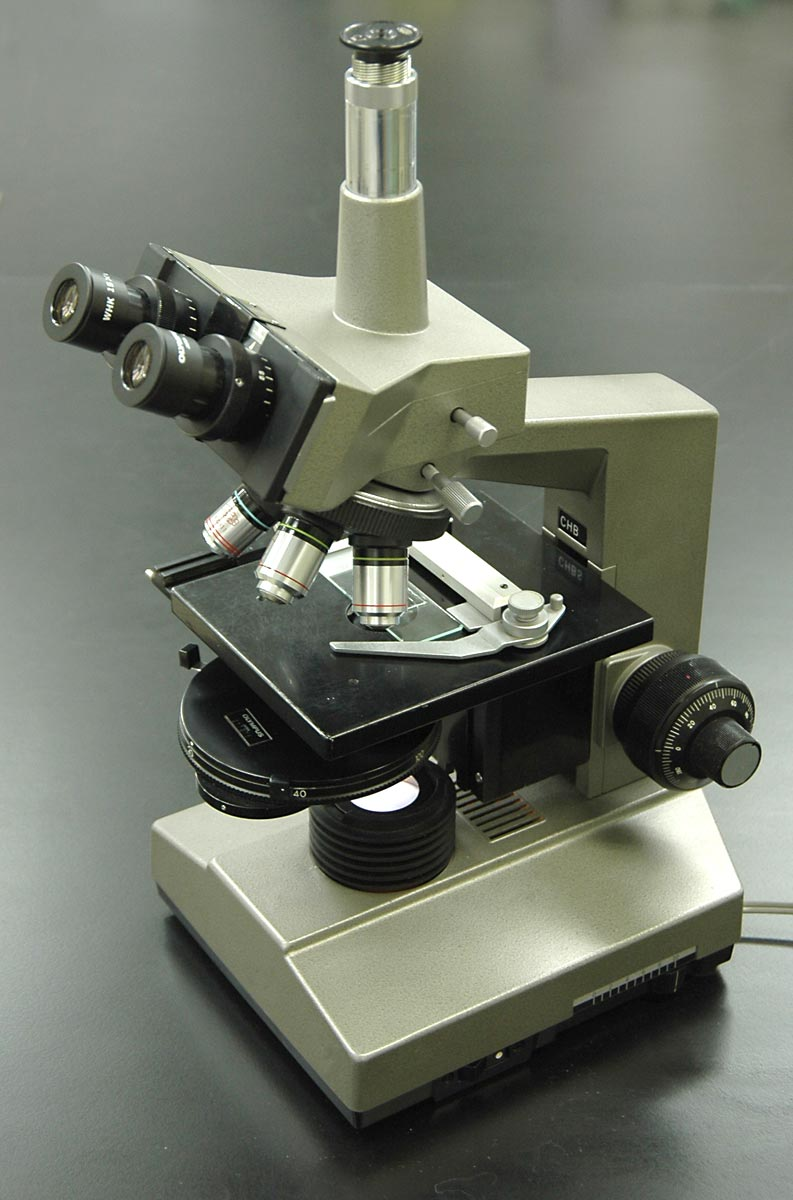
A phase-contrast microscope. Frits Zernike's invention permits the study of internal cell structure without the need to stain and thus kill the cells.

In optical microscopy many objects such as cell parts in protozoans, bacteria and sperm tails are essentially fully transparent unless stained (and therefore killed). The difference in densities and composition within these objects however often gives rise to changes in the phase of light passing through them, hence they are sometimes called "phase objects". Using the phase-contrast technique makes these structures visible and allows the study of living specimens. This phase contrast technique proved to be such an advancement in microscopy that Dutch physicist Frits Zernike was awarded the Nobel Prize in 1953.

==== Magnetic horn (1961) ====
The magnetic horn (also known as the Van der Meer horn) is a high-current, pulsed focusing device, invented by the Dutch physicist Simon van der Meer at CERN. It selects pions and focuses them into a sharp beam. Its original application was in the context of neutrino physics, where beams of pions have to be tightly focused. When the pions then decay into muons and neutrinos or antineutrinos, an equally well-focused neutrino beam is obtained. The muons were stopped in a wall of 3000 tons of iron and 1000 tons of concrete, leaving the neutrinos or antineutrinos to reach the Gargamelle bubble chamber.

=== Sports and games ===
==== International Skating Union (1892) ====
The International Skating Union (ISU) is the international governing body for competitive ice skating disciplines, including figure skating, synchronized skating, speed skating, and short track speed skating. It was founded in Scheveningen, Netherlands, in 1892, making it the oldest governing international winter sport federation and one of the oldest international sport federations.

The first official World Championships in Speed Skating (open to men only) directly under the auspices of the ISU were held in Amsterdam in 1893.

==== Tiki-taka (1990s) ====
FC Barcelona and the Spain national football team play a style of football known as Tiki-taka that has its roots in Total Football. Johan Cruyff founded Tiki-taka (commonly spelled tiqui-taca in Spanish) during his time as manager of FC Barcelona (1988–1996). The style was successfully adopted by the all-conquering Spain national football team (2008–2012) and Pep Guardiola's Barcelona team (2009–2011). Tiki-taka style differs from Total Football in that it focuses on ball movement rather than positional interchange.

=== Technology and engineering ===
==== Thermostat (1620s) ====
Around the 1620s, Cornelis Drebbel developed an automatic temperature control system for a furnace, motivated by his belief that base metals could be turned to gold by holding them at a precise constant temperature for long periods of time. He also used this temperature regulator in an incubator for hatching chickens.

==== Magic lantern (1659) ====
The magic lantern is an optical device, an early type of image projector developed in the 17th century. People have been projecting images using concave mirrors and pin-hole cameras (camera obscura) since Roman times. But glass lens technology was not sufficiently developed to make advanced optical devices (such as telescope and microscope) until the 17th century. With pinhole cameras and camera obscura it was only possible to project an image of actual scene, such as an image of the sun, on a surface. The magic lantern on the other hand could project a painted image on a surface, and marks the point where cameras and projectors became two different kinds of devices. There has been some debate about who the original inventor of the magic lantern is, but the most widely accepted theory is that Christiaan Huygens developed the original device in the late 1650s. However, other sources give credit to the German priest Athanasius Kircher. He describes a device such as the magic lantern in his book Ars Magna Lucis et Umbrae. Huygens is credited because of his major innovation in lantern technology, which was the replacement of images etched on mirrors from earlier lanterns such as Kircher's with images painted on glass.

==== Meat slicer (1898) ====
A meat slicer, also called a slicing machine, deli slicer or simply a slicer, is a tool used in butcher shops and delicatessens to slice meats and cheeses. The first meat slicer was invented by Wilhelm van Berkel (Wilhelmus Adrianus van Berkel) in Rotterdam in 1898. Older models of meat slicer may be operated by crank, while newer ones generally use an electric motor.

==== Pentode (1926) ====
A pentode is an electronic device having five active electrodes. The term most commonly applies to a three-grid vacuum tube (thermionic valve), which was invented by the Dutchman Bernhard D.H. Tellegen in 1926.

==== Philishave (1939) ====
Philishave was the brand name for electric shavers manufactured by the Philips Domestic Appliances and Personal Care unit of Philips (in the US, the Norelco name is used). The Philishave shaver was invented by Philips engineer Alexandre Horowitz, who used rotating cutters instead of the reciprocating cutters that had been used in previous electric shavers.

==== Gyrator (1948) ====
A gyrator is a passive, linear, lossless, two-port electrical network element invented by Tellegen as a hypothetical fifth linear element after the resistor, capacitor, inductor and ideal transformer.

==== Traffic enforcement camera (1958) ====
Dutch company Gatsometer BV, founded by the 1950s rally driver Maurice Gatsonides, invented the first traffic enforcement camera. Gatsonides wished to better monitor his speed around the corners of a race track and came up with the device in order to improve his time around the circuit.

==== Clap skate (1980) ====
The clap skate (also called clapskates, slap skates, slapskates) is a type of ice skate used in speed skating. Clap skates were developed at the Faculty of Human Movement Sciences of the Vrije Universiteit of Amsterdam, led by Gerrit Jan van Ingen Schenau, although the idea is much older. van Ingen Schenau, who started work on a hinged speed skate in 1979, created his first prototype in 1980 and finished his PhD thesis on the subject in 1981 using the premise that a skater would benefit from extended movement keeping the blade on the ice, allowing the calf muscles more time to exert force.

==== Cremulator (1981) ====
The Cremulator is a machine developed by the Dutch company ALL Europe in 1981. The Cremulator is used after cremation, about 3 kg of ashes remain on average. These ash residues are reduced in a cremulator (also called a mill) for subsequent scattering or in an urn. The Cremulator is now further developed by DFW Europe as cremation equipment manufacturer in The Netherlands.

==== Modern air fryer (2005) ====
The modern air fryer, a kitchen appliance, was invented by Fred van der Weij, a Dutch engineer, in 2005. Van der Weij was inspired to create a device that could fry foods with minimal oil, aiming to produce healthier versions of traditionally deep-fried dishes. After extensive experimentation, he developed a prototype that resembled a wooden dog kennel and used rapid air circulation to cook food evenly while creating a crispy exterior. His invention gained commercial success when Philips launched the first consumer air fryer in 2010, quickly becoming popular worldwide for its ability to prepare lower-fat meals with ease.

=== Transportation ===
==== Herring Buss (15th century) ====
A herring buss (Dutch: Haringbuis) was a type of seagoing fishing vessel, used by Dutch and Flemish herring fishermen in the 15th through early 19th centuries. The Buis was first adapted for use as a fishing vessel in the Netherlands, after the invention of gibbing made it possible to preserve herring at sea. This made longer voyages feasible, and hence enabled Dutch fishermen to follow the herring shoals far from the coasts. The first herring buss was probably built in Hoorn around 1415. The last one was built in Vlaardingen in 1841.

==== Fluyt (16th century) ====
Fluyt, a type of sailing vessel originally designed as a dedicated cargo vessel. Originating from the Netherlands in the 16th century, the vessel was designed to facilitate transoceanic delivery with the maximum of space and crew efficiency. The inexpensive ship could be built in large numbers. This ship class was credited with enhancing Dutch competitiveness in international trade and was widely employed by the Dutch East India Company in the 17th and 18th centuries. The fluyt was a significant factor in the 17th century rise of the Dutch seaborne empire.

==== Wind-powered sawmill (1592) ====
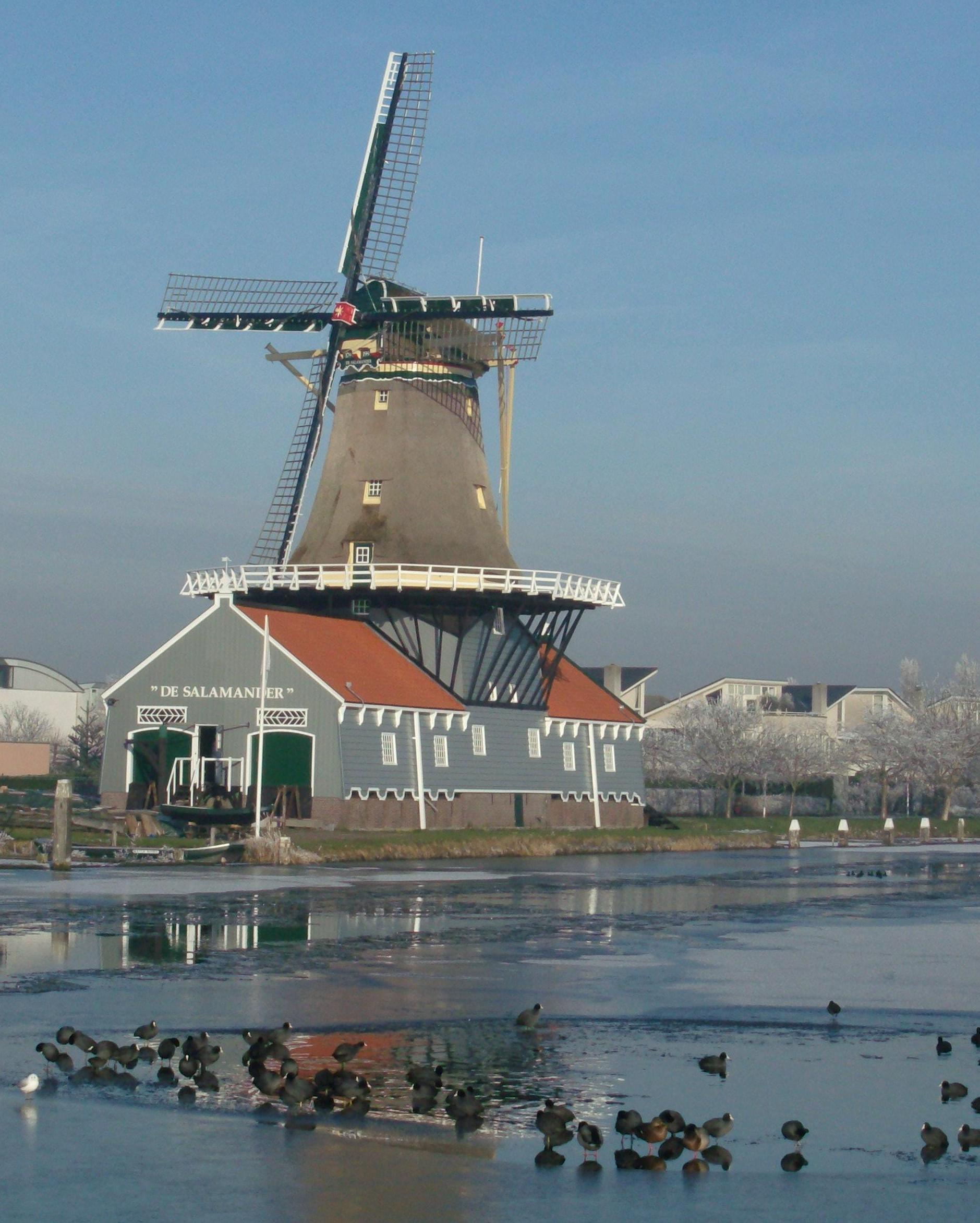
De Salamander, a wind-driven sawmill in Leidschendam

Cornelis Corneliszoon was the inventor of the wind-powered sawmill.

==== Schooner (prototype) (17th century) ====
A schooner is a type of sailing vessel with fore-and-aft sails on two or more masts, the foremast being no taller than the rear mast(s). Such vessels were first used by the Dutch in the 16th or 17th century (but may not have been called that at the time). Schooners first evolved from a variety of small two-masted gaff-rigged vessels used in the coast and estuaries of the Netherlands in the late 17th century. Most were working craft but some pleasure yachts with schooner rigs were built for wealthy merchants and Dutch nobility. Following arrival of the Dutch-born prince William III the Orange on the British throne, the British Royal Navy built a Royal yacht with a schooner rig in 1695, HMS Royal Transport. This vessel, captured in a detailed Admiralty model, is the earliest fully documented schooner. Royal Transport was quickly noted for its speed and ease of handling and mercantile vessels soon adopted the rig in Europe and in European colonies in North America. Schooners were immediately popular with colonial traders and fishermen in North America with the first documented reference to a schooner in America appearing in Boston port records in 1716. North American shipbuilders quickly developed a variety of schooner forms for trading, fishing and privateering. According to the language scholar Walter William Skeat, the term schooner comes from scoon, while the sch spelling comes from the later adoption of the Dutch spelling ("schoener"). Another study suggests that a Dutch expression praising ornate schooner yachts in the 17th century, "een schoone Schip", may have led to the term "schooner" being used by English speakers to describe the early versions of the schooner rig as it evolved in England and America.

==== First verified (navigable) submarine (1620) ====
Cornelius Drebbel was the inventor of the first verified navigable submarine, while working for the British Royal Navy. He designed and manufactured a steerable submarine with a leather-covered wooden frame. Between 1620 and 1624 Drebbel successfully built and tested two more, successively larger vessels. The third model had 6 oars and could carry 16 passengers. This model was demonstrated to King James I and several thousand Londoners. The submarine stayed submerged for three hours and could travel from Westminster to Greenwich and back, cruising at a depth of from 12 to 15 feet (3.7 to 4.6 m). This submarine was tested many times in the Thames, but never used in battle.

In 2002, the British boatbuilder Mark Edwards built a wooden submarine based on the original 17th-century version by Drebbel. This was shown in the BBC TV programme Building the Impossible in November 2002. It is a scale working model of the original and was built using tools and construction methods common in 17th century boat building and was successfully tested under water with two rowers at Dorney Lake, diving beneath the surface and being rowed underwater for 10 minutes. Legal considerations prevented its use on the River Thames itself.

==== First ever car equipped with a six-cylinder engine, along with four-wheel drive (1903) ====
Spyker is credited with building and racing the first ever four-wheel racing car in 1903. The first four-wheel-drive car with internal combustion engine, the Spyker 60 H.P., was presented in 1903 by Dutch brothers Jacobus and Hendrik-Jan Spijker of Amsterdam. The two-seat sports car, which was also the first ever car equipped with a six-cylinder engine, is now an exhibit in the Louwman Collection (the former Nationaal Automobiel Museum) at the Hague in The Netherlands.
