= Zeelandic Flanders =

Zeeuws-Vlaanderen
- Region
- Flag

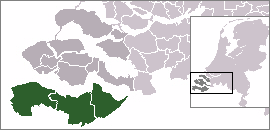
- Location of Zeelandic Flanders in Zeeland, Netherlands
- Coordinates: 51°20′N 3°49′E
- Country: Netherlands
- Province: Zeeland
- Municipalities: Sluis; Terneuzen; Hulst

Area
  - Total: 875.80 km^{2} (338.15 sq mi)
  - Land: 733.19 km^{2} (283.09 sq mi)
  - Water: 142.61 km^{2} (55.06 sq mi)

Population (31 December 2010)
  - Total: 106,522
- Postal code: 4500-4599
- Area code(s): 0114, 0115, 0117
- Major roads: N58, N60, N61, N62 (Western Scheldt Tunnel)

Zeelandic Flanders (Dutch: Zeeuws-Vlaanderen [ˌzeːusˈflaːndərə(n)]; Zeeuws: Zeêuws-Vlaonderen; West Flemish: Zêeuws-Vloandern) is the southernmost region of the province of Zeeland in the south-western Netherlands. It lies south of the Western Scheldt that separates the region from the remainder of Zeeland and the mainland Netherlands to the north. Zeelandic Flanders is bordered to the south and to the east by Belgium.

== Geography ==
Zeelandic Flanders is the north-eastern part of the large historical region of Flanders which today lies mostly in Belgium. It shares a land border with the Belgian provinces of East and West Flanders. It is a latitudinally oriented strip of land along the Western Scheldt, a North Sea estuary, and has no land access to the rest of the Netherlands. The westernmost point of the European Netherlands lies here in Sluis. The area of Zeelandic Flanders is 876 km^{2} (338 sq mi) of which 733 km^{2} (283 sq mi) is land and 143 km^{2} (55 sq mi) is water.

The region is bordered by the Zwin nature reserve in the West and the Drowned Land of Saeftinghe in the East.

Since local government boundary reforms in 2003, Zeelandic Flanders has consisted of only three municipalities: Sluis in the west, Terneuzen in the centre and Hulst in the east.

== Transport ==
Zeelandic Flanders is connected to Zuid-Beveland to the north by the Western Scheldt Tunnel under the Western Scheldt (estuary). The tunnel arrives 18 km east of Flushing on the Zuid-Beveland peninsula. Until 2003 when the tunnel was opened, Zeelandic Flanders was cut off from the rest of Zeeland and the only land route was to go via the Antwerp region in Belgium.

There used to be two car ferries connecting Zeelandic Flanders to other parts of Zeeland, one ferry from Perkpolder to Kruiningen on Zuid-Beveland and the second one from Breskens to Flushing on Walcheren. This last ferry service still exists, but can only be used by pedestrians and cyclists nowadays.

The Ghent–Terneuzen Canal passes through Zeelandic Flanders.

A freight railway line connects Terneuzen to Gent-Dampoort railway station.

== History ==
Except for some formerly insular areas, the region now called Zeelandic Flanders was not part of the historical County of Zeeland, but a part of the County of Flanders initially ruled by the counts of Flanders and later by the House of Habsburg. The region was on the front line in the Eighty Years' War and was conquered by the Dutch Republic in 1604. As such, it was the only part of Flanders, which took part in the insurgency, to become part of the new republic.

Zeelandic Flanders was subsequently ruled directly by the Dutch States General (parliament) as one of the Generality Lands and called Flanders of the States (Staats-Vlaanderen). After occupation by the French in 1795, the area accrued to the département of Escaut. Before the formation of the United Kingdom of the Netherlands in 1815, Zeelandic Flanders was territory of the Dutch province of North Brabant for a few years, but when the present province of Zeeland was formed, Zeelandic Flanders became a part of it, and remained so even after the 1830 Belgian Revolution that separated the remainder of Dutch Flanders from the Netherlands.

As of 2010, the population of Zeelandic Flanders was 106,522 with 145 per square kilometre (380/sq mi).

== Disputes with Belgium ==
As Zeelandic Flanders was historically part of Flanders, demands and plans to annex it have been made by Belgian politicians on multiple occasions. A famous example was when Leopold II made plans to invade the Netherlands before he became king. He also planned to annex Dutch Limburg, and had spies gain information on the Dutch military. He decided to abandon his plans after contacting France, who did not support them.

Another occasion was shortly after World War I, when Belgium once again claimed both Zeelandic Flanders and Limburg, this time as compensation for Dutch neutrality in the war. Despite this neutrality, Belgium felt it was a sign of support for Germany and suspected the Netherlands of collaborating with the Central Powers.

== Language ==
The native dialect of the western part of the region is Zeelandic Flemish, that can be considered a variety of both West Flemish and closely related Zeelandic. In the central regions, the Land-van-Axels and Land-van-Cadzands dialects of Zeelandic, itself a transition language between West Flemish and Hollandic, are spoken. In the eastern part, East Flemish with some Brabantian influence is spoken. Because some smaller areas were isolated by water, and thus being small islands, there are some dialects that differ slightly from the 'normal' dialect.

== Notable people ==
- Lodewijk van den Berg, astronaut
- Willem Beukelszoon, inventor of gibbing
- Johan Hendrik van Dale, lexicographer, creator of Van Dale Great Dictionary of the Dutch Language
- Dick Dees, politician
- Jan Eekhout, author
- Jacques Hamelink, author and poet
- Willem van Hanegem, football player and coach
- Ate de Jong, director
- Annabel Kosten, swimmer
- Theo Middelkamp, professional cyclist
- Roelof Nelissen, politician and banker
- Pieter Paulus, politician of the Patriot Movement
- Jos de Putter, director
- Sandra Roelofs, First lady of Georgia (spouse of president Mikheil Saakashvili)
- Paul Tingen, writer, journalist, musician
- Kees Torn, comedian
- Cornelis de Vos, painter
- Mathilde Willink, society figure
- Herman Wijffels, Dutch administrator of the World Bank in Washington

== See also ==
- Flanders
- Western Scheldt
- Zeeland
