= Jacques Hamelink =

Dutch poet, novelist, and literary critic (1939–2021)

- Born: Jacobus Marinus Hamelink; 12 January 1939; Driewegen, Netherlands
- Died: 17 November 2021 (aged 82)
- Occupations: Novelist, poet, teacher
- Writing career
- Notable work: Het plantaardig bewind (1964)

Jacobus Marinus Hamelink (12 January 1939 – 17 November 2021), better known as Jacques Hamelink, was a Dutch poet, novelist, and literary critic, who is best known for his early short story collections such as Het plantaardig bewind ("The Vegetative Dominion", 1964) and De rudimentaire mens ("Rudimentary Man", 1968). Later on in his career he gradually abandoned his pessimistic prose and chose to write more and more poetry full of historical and literary references, while at the same time not neglecting the sound value of his verse. These two factors have gradually alienated him from an initially enthusiastic audience.

== Writing and reception ==
Hamelink was born in Driewegen. His early stories (as collected in Het plantaardig bewind, Horror vacui and De rudimentaire mens) revolve around the interplay between man and nature, where the former is always inferior to the latter. Main characters in these stories often disappear or die faced with the amoral and omnipresent force of life. The poetry, collected in such books as De eeuwige dag ("The Eternal Day") and Een koude onrust ("A Cold Anxiety"), is in a very similar vein, and both poetry and prose were enthusiastically received by audience and critics alike.

This initial success would be short-lived: starting with Oudere gronden ("Older soils") Hamelink's poetry became more and more abstract, bare of all personal involvement but still maintaining the same themes. His work was quickly branded hermetic and shoved to the side. Despite his growing unpopularity, Hamelink continued on his set course, which would become more and more mystical as the years progressed. His growing belief, borrowed from poets such as Paul Celan and Hölderlin, was that poetry should try to speak the impossible, and that its failure to do this constitutes its greatness. This was perhaps most effectively enunciated in the speech "Op weg naar de poëzie" ("On the Way to Poetry"), published in the significantly titled Niemandsgedichten ("Nobodypoems").

Paradoxically, after the publication of Niemandsgedichten Hamelink's poetry became more instead, less personal. This is most obvious in books such as Ceremoniële en particuliere madrigalen ("Ceremonial and Specific Madrigals") and Herinnering aan het verdwenen licht ("Remembrance of the Disappeared Light"), where he dealt with the history of his own family and the particular surroundings (the Dutch province of Zeelandic Flanders) of his youth.

These years (the 1980s) also feature the publication of two important critical texts: De droom van de poëzie ("The Dream of Poetry") and In een lege kamer een garendraadje ("In an Empty Room a Piece of String"). The former is a wider treatment of the trend set by Op weg naar de poëzie: for Hamelink, the writer who tries to capture the "mystery" has to be thoroughly familiar with both human history and the literary tradition. In doing this Hamelink consciously placed himself in a tradition that stretches from Dante Alighieri to T. S. Eliot.

Similarly to the poet, high demands are made on the reader and critic. In een lege kamer een garendraadje is a violent attack on a contemporary Dutch literary criticism that was less and less appreciative of Hamelink's work. Hamelink especially reproached his contemporaries for their lack of knowledge of the classics and their complacent admiration of "experimental" poetry.

After Sacrale komedie ("Sacral Comedy") his work became highly allusive, with personal and "general" history fusing in ever more rigidly constructed poems. The language of these poems heightens their difficulty: the author riffs on existing words, creating neologisms while at the same time reintroducing archaic words.

Prominent Dutch critics and poets such as Ilja Leonard Pfeijffer have written positive reviews on his later works and two of his publications were nominated for the prestigious VSB poetry prize.

== Work ==
- 1964 - De eeuwige dag (poetry)
- 1964 - Het plantaardig bewind (short stories)
- 1966 - Horror vacui (prose)
- 1967 - Een koude onrust (poetry)
- 1968 - De rudimentaire mens (short stories)
- 1969 - Oudere gronden (poetry)
- 1969 - Ranonkel of de geschiedenis van een verzelving (novel)
- 1970 - De betoverde bruidsnacht (drama)
- 1971 - Geest van spraak en tegenspraak (poetry)
- 1973 - De boom Goliath (prose)
- 1973 - Windwaarts, wortelher (poetry)
- 1974 - Afdalingen in de ingewanden (prose)
- 1974 - Witvelden, inskripties (poetry)
- 1975 - Hersenopgang (poetry)
- 1976 - Een reis door het demiurgenrijk (prose)
- 1976 - Niemandsgedichten (selected poetry)
- 1977 - Stenen voor mijzelf (poetry)
- 1978 - De droom van de poëzie (essay)
- 1979 - Gehandhaafde verhalen (selected prose)
- 1979 - Het rif (poetry)
- 1980 - In een lege kamer een garen draadje (criticism)
- 1980 - Responsoria (poetry)
- 1982 - Ceremoniële en particuliere madrigalen (poetry)
- 1983 - Uit een nieuwe Akasha-kroniek (short stories)
- 1984 - Gemengde tijd (poetry)
- 1985 - Vuurproeven (criticism)
- 1986 - Eerste gedichten (selected poetry)
- 1986 - Herinnering aan het verdwenen licht (poetry)
- 1987 - Sacrale komedie (poetry)
- 1988 - Asael's rust (poetry)
- 1990 - Runen van de ruin (poetry) (published under pseudonym A.D.)
- 1992 - Groot eiland (poetry) (published under pseudonym A.D.)
- 1994 - Folklore imaginaire de Flandre (poetry) (published under pseudonym A.D.)
- 1995 - Boheems glas (poetry)
- 1997 - Zeegezang inclusief gesternten van Frederik de Zeeman (poetry)
- 1999 - Liedboek der oorlogen en feesten van al-Haqq (poetry)
- 2001 - Zilverzonnige en onneembare maan (poetry)
- 2003 - Kinksteen van Ch'in (poetry)
- 2007 - De Dame van de Tapisserie (poetry)
- 2010 - Germania, een canto (poetry)
- 2013 - Vigerende oudelandse grond (poetry)
- 2016 - Oden voor komende nacht (poetry)
- 2020 - Solituden, songs (poetry)
