= Gerrit Jan van Ingen Schenau =

Gerrit Jan van Ingen Schenau (13 September 1944, Leiden – 2 April 1998, Weteringbrug) was a Dutch biomechanist. He made large contributions to the field of biomechanics, particularly muscle coordination, energetics of movement, and the functions of biarticular muscles. He focused on speed skating in particular, and played a significant part in the invention of the clap skate.

He died of cancer in 1998.
