= Clap skate =

Type of skate with a spring mechanism

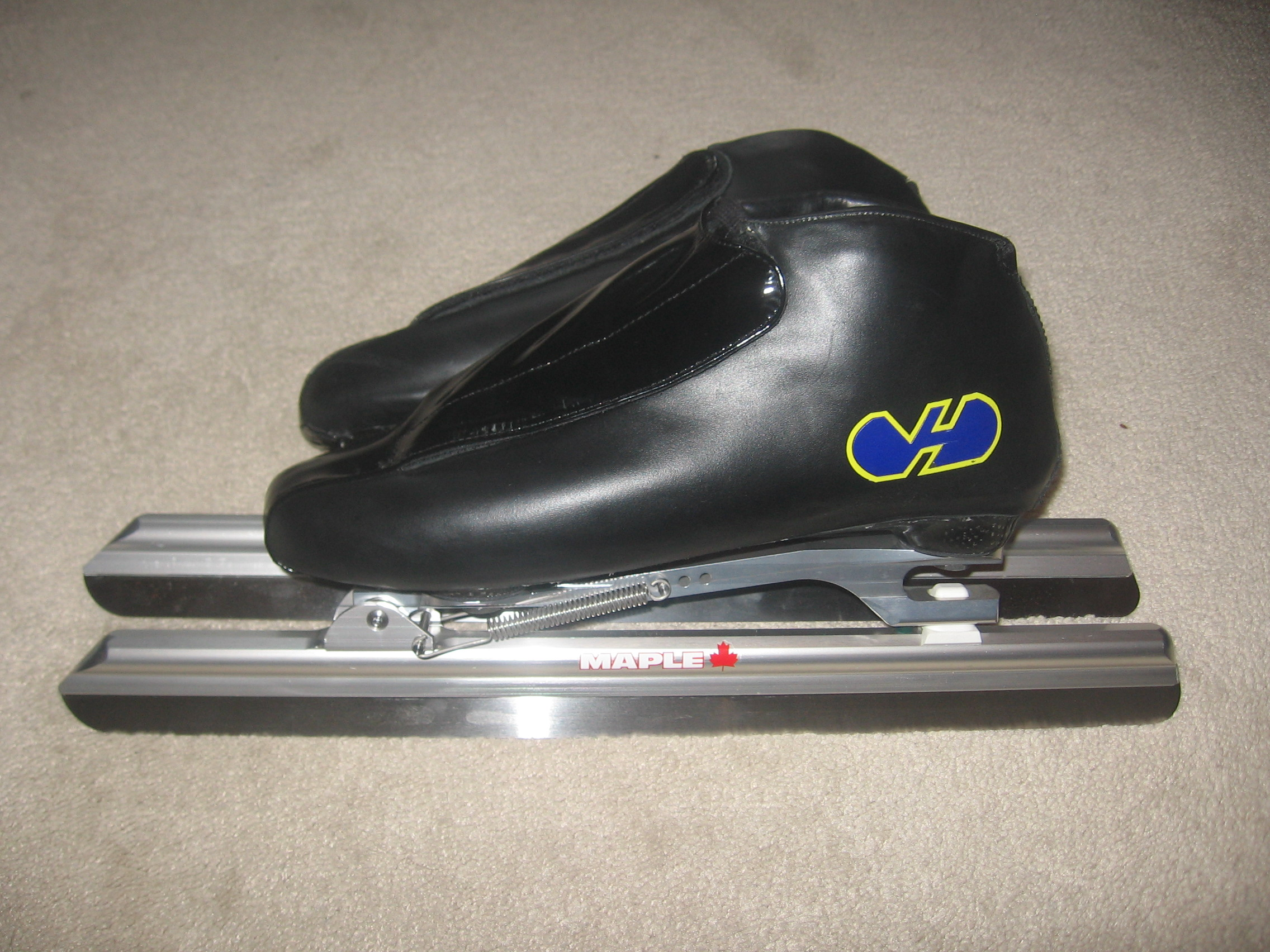
Two clap skates

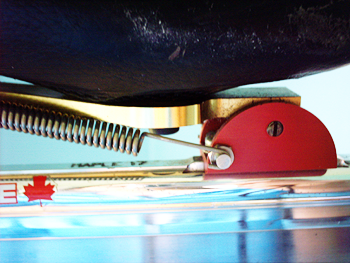
Hinge of a clap skate

Regular skate and clap skate compared

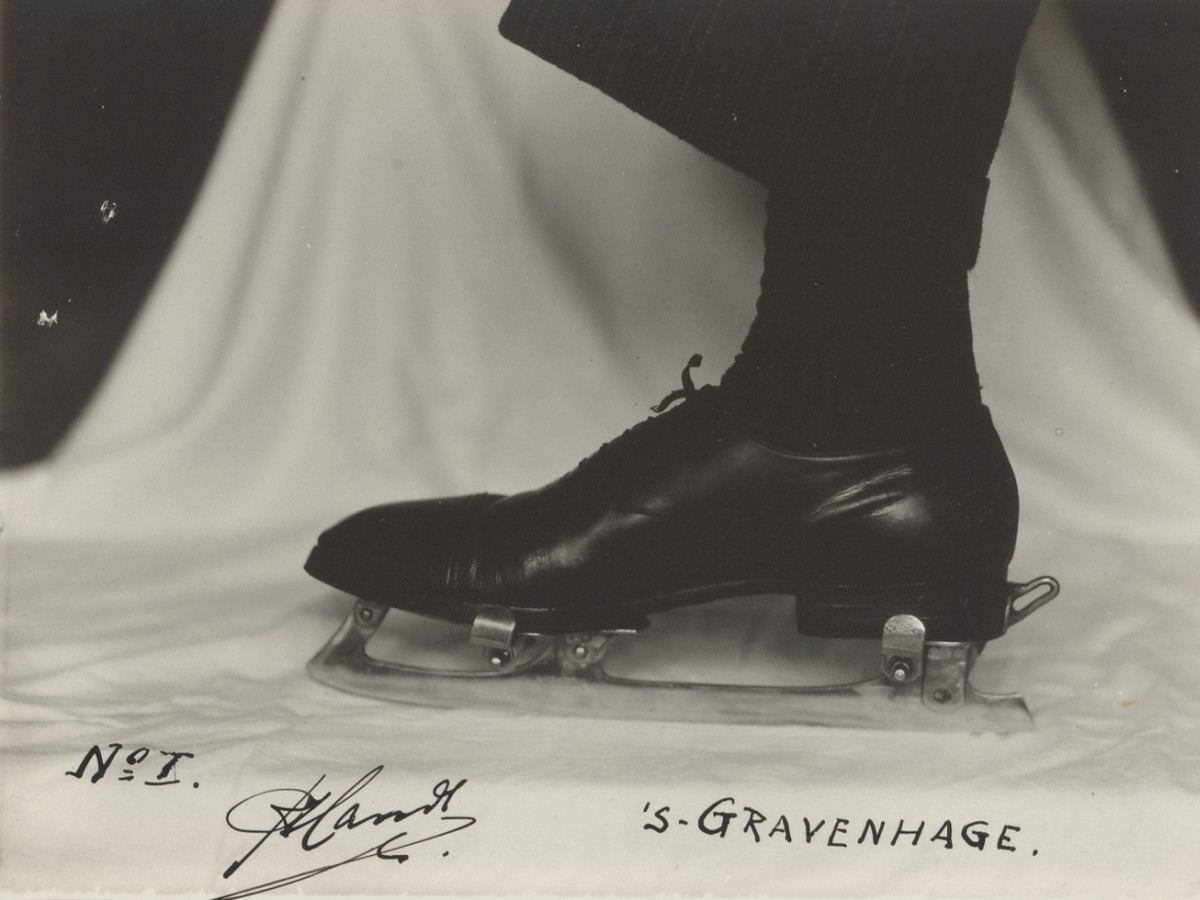
An early clap skate in 1936

The clap skate (also called clapper skates, clapskates, slap skates, slapskates, from Dutch klapschaats) is a type of ice skate used in speed skating. Unlike in traditional skates where the blade is rigidly fixed to the boot, clap skates have the blade attached to the boot by a hinge at the front. This allows the blade to remain in contact with the ice longer, as the ankle can now be extended toward the end of the stroke, as well as for more natural movement, thereby distributing the energy of the leg more effectively and efficiently.

Clap skates were developed at the Faculty of Human Movement Sciences of the Vrije Universiteit of Amsterdam, led by Gerrit Jan van Ingen Schenau, although the idea of a clap skate is much older; designs dating from around 1900 are known.

The clap skate was used first in the 1984/1985 skating season. It was, however, not until the late 1990s that the idea was taken seriously. In the 1996/1997 season, the Dutch women's team started using the skates with great success. The rest of the skating world soon followed suit, causing a torrent of world records to be broken in the following seasons, including the 1998 Winter Olympics in Nagano, Japan.

== History ==
The idea of a hinging skate was described and patented in 1894 by Karl Hannes, from Raitenhaslach, Burghausen. It was re-invented by Gerrit Jan van Ingen Schenau, who started work on a hinged speed skate in 1979, created his first prototype in 1980 and finished his PhD thesis on the subject in 1981 on the premise that a skater would benefit from the extended movement with the skate on the ice, allowing the calf muscles to longer partake in the skate movement. The construction of the hinge was refined further in collaboration with Viking. In 1985 Ron Ket was the first to ride the clap skates in an officially timed setting, a 500-meter sprint on the Jaap Eden baan, clocking in on a promising 40.65. In February 1986 Henk Gemser who was coaching the Dutch national speedskating squad at that time expressed his intention to start training with the clap skate, though no subsequent trials were run on the new skate. In the 1986–1987 season a small number of marathon skaters intended to use the clap skate competitively, but its use was prohibited by match officials due to increased risk of physical harm to the skaters in case of a fall. The then current Dutch speed skating top professionals Ids Postma, Bart Veldkamp and Rintje Ritsma were unimpressed by the skate.

For the 1994–1995 season, 11 skaters from the South Holland 14–18 age category started using the clap skate competitively. Those 11 showed an average improvement of 6.25% on their times, compared to 2.5% of the other skaters using regular speed skates. Ten of them placed for the national championship.

In the 1996–1997 season, the use of the clap skate caught on at the highest level, and in 1997 Tonny de Jong was the first European all round champion using the clap skate, leaving Gunda Niemann, the defending world champion, in second place. Niemann remarked that the skate was illegal, and should be outlawed. In the following years the clap skate started to dominate the long track speedskating landscape. The design was banned from use in short track speed skating.

Research completed in 2000 by Dutch sport scientist Han Houdijk showed that the speed gain from using the clap skate does not originate in using the calf muscle to stretch the ankle, as was assumed in the creation of the clap skate, but in the fact that the point of rotation is moved from the tip of the skate to the hinge, facilitating the transfer of power to the ice.
