= Gibbing =

Process of preparing salt herring

A herring

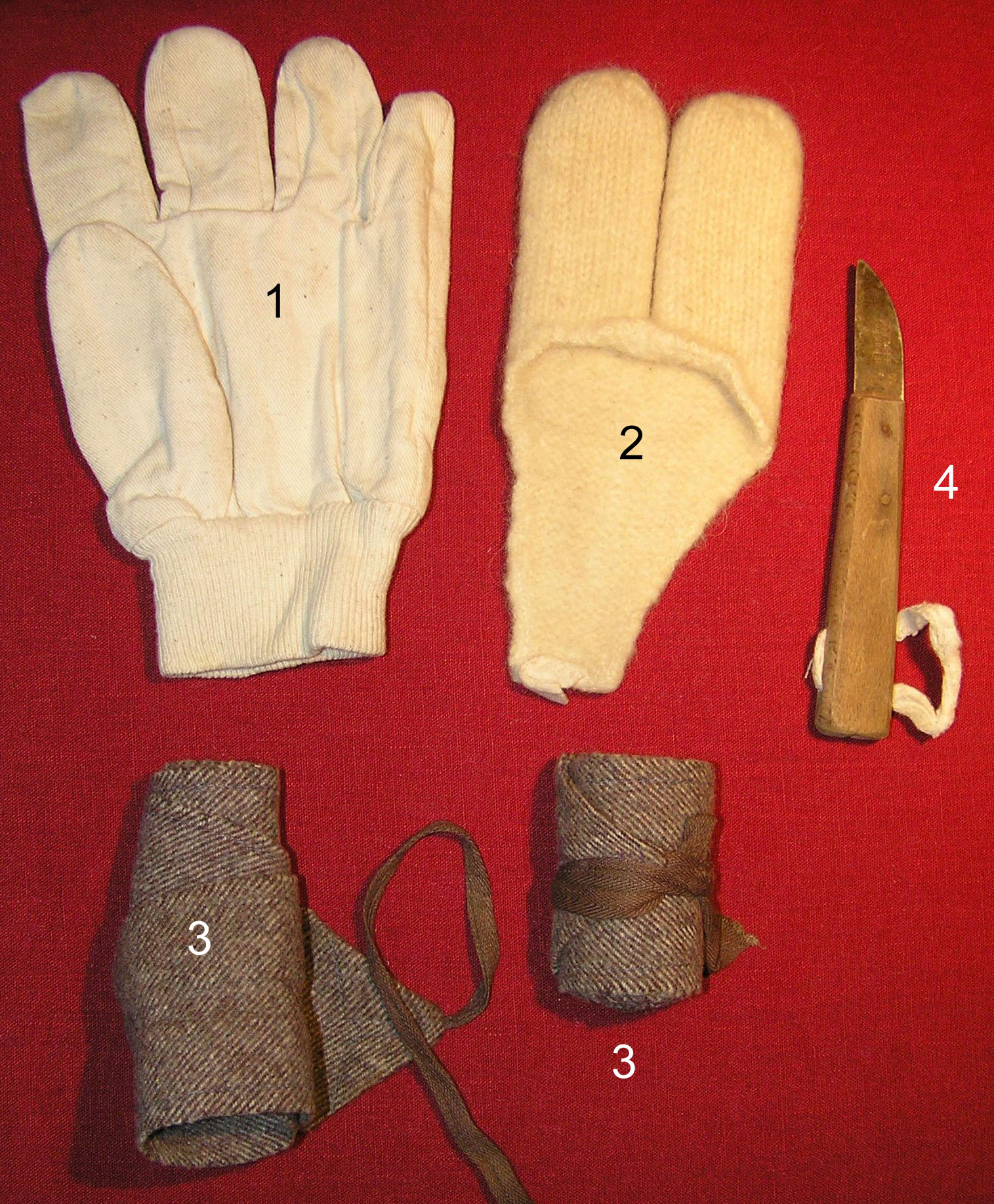
Utensils used in 1966 in the process of gibbing on a lugger

Gibbing is the process of preparing salt herring (or soused herring), in which the gills and part of the gullet are removed from the fish, eliminating any bitter taste. The liver and pancreas are left in the fish during the salt-curing process because they release enzymes essential for flavor. The fish is then cured in a barrel with one part salt to 20 herring. Today many variations and local preferences exist in this process.

== History ==
According to a popular story, the process of gibbing was invented by Willem Beukelszoon (a.k.a. Willem Beuckelsz, William Buckels or William Buckelsson), a 14th-century fisherman from Biervliet, Zealand^{,}. The invention of this fish preservation technique led to the Dutch becoming a seafaring power.

Sometime between 1380 and 1386, Beuckelsz discovered that "salt fish will keep, and that fish that can be kept can be packed and can be exported".

Beuckelsz' invention of gibbing created an export industry for salt herring that was monopolized by the Dutch. They began to build ships and eventually moved from trading in herring to colonizing and the Dutch Empire.

The Emperor Charles V erected a statue to Beuckelsz honouring him as the benefactor of his country, and Queen Mary of Hungary after finding his tomb sat upon it and ate a herring.

Herring is still very important to the Dutch who celebrate Vlaggetjesdag (Flag Day) each spring, as a tradition that dates back to the 14th century when fishermen went out to sea in their small boats to capture the annual catch, and to preserve and export their catch abroad.

== See also ==
- Herring buss
