= William Buckels =

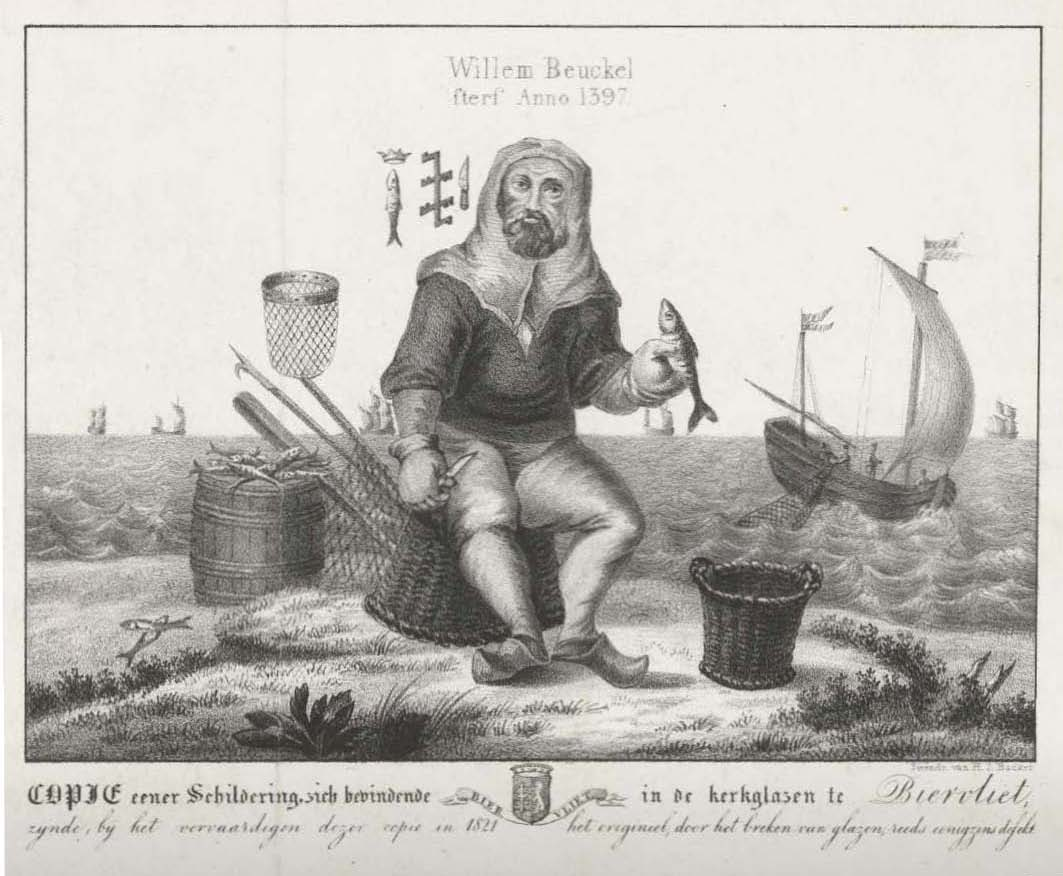
1821 lithograph copy by Hilmar Johannes Backer of a stained glass church window in Biervliet depicting Buckels at his pastime

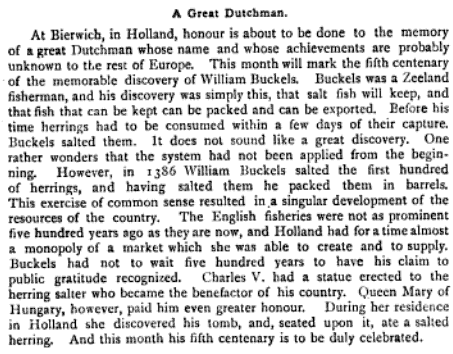
Article on Buckels appearing at page 4 of the September 9, 1886 edition of The Pall Mall Budget (no. 937, vol. XXXIV) commemorating the fifth centenary of his invention

William Buckels, also known as Willem Beuckel, Willem Beuckelsz or William Buckelsson, and sometimes Willem Beuckelszoon by the Dutch, was a 14th-century fisherman from Biervliet, Zeeland, whose discovery of gibbing, a preservation process for herring, led to the Dutch becoming a maritime power.

Buckels, now called Willem Beuckelszoon by the Netherlands Board of Tourism and Conventions, has been recognized as a Dutch national hero for his accomplishment from that day on. On September 9, 1886 the Pall Mall Budget featured an article (pictured at right) marking the 500th anniversary (fifth centenary) of William Buckels' discovery that "salt fish will keep, and that fish that can be kept can be packed and can be exported". The New York Times reprinted the article later that month. In 1386 William Buckels salted and packed (into barrels) the first hundred preserved herrings, ultimately leading to Holland's monopoly in the new market which subsequently developed from Buckels' discovery. Holland and especially Amsterdam, said to be "built on Herring bones", reaped great wealth from the herring fishery in subsequent years, made possible by the ability to preserve fish through Buckel's process.

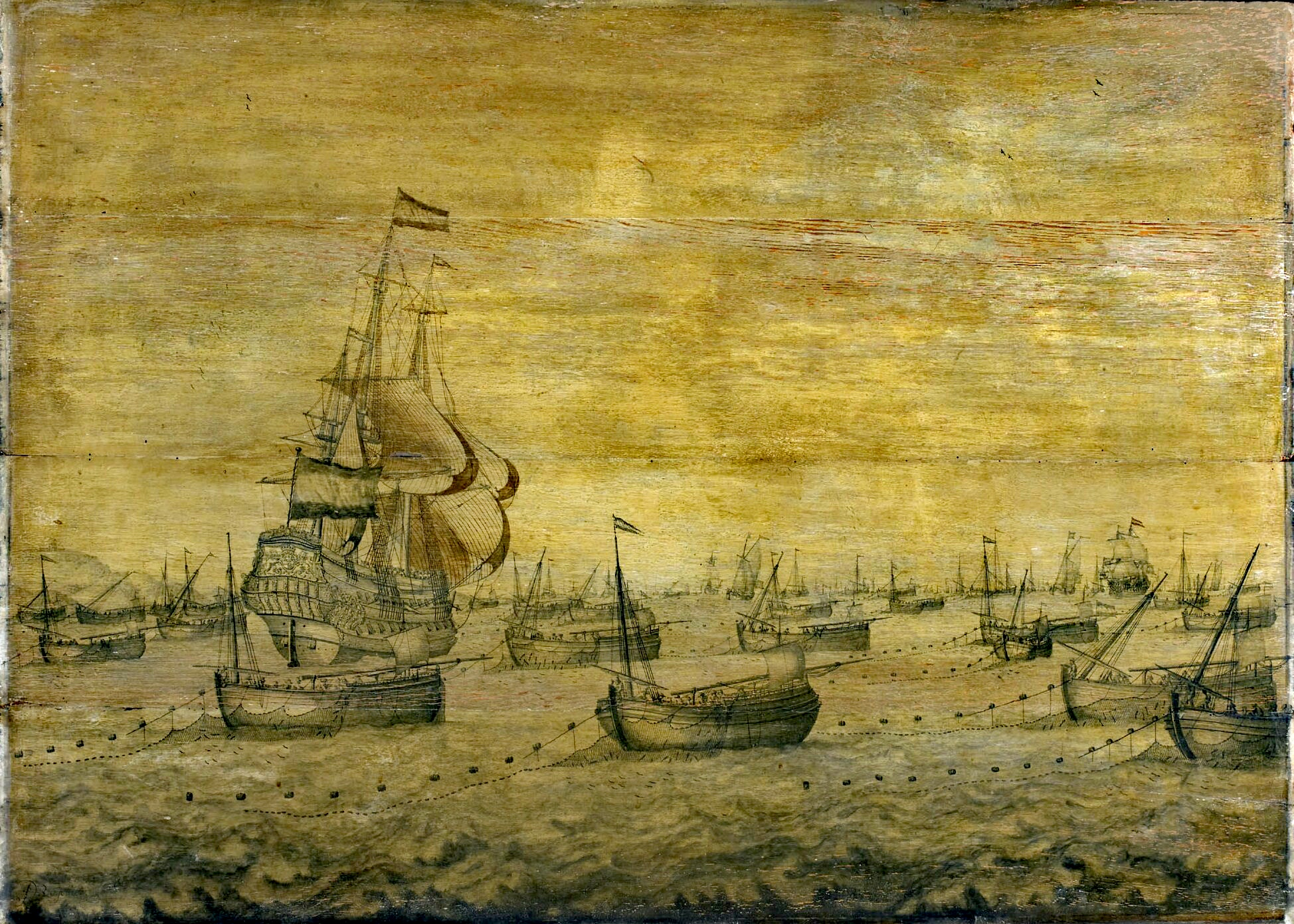
The Dutch Herring Fleet (c. 1656 to 1730), by Pieter Vogelaer

The process discovered by Buckels is known as "gibbing". The gills and part of the gullet of the fish are removed, eliminating any bitter taste, and the liver and pancreas remain in the fish during salt-curing, releasing enzymes that flavour the fish. After gill and gullet removal, the fish are put into barrels for curing with a 1:20 ratio of salt to herring.

Following Buckels' innovation the Dutch began to build ships to transport salted herring to export markets, which eventually led to the Netherlands becoming a seafaring power.

In 1556 the Holy Roman Emperor, Charles V, publicly acknowledged Buckels' contribution to the Dutch economy with a ceremony and a commemorative statue.

In the 1807 work The Naturalist's Cabinet, the author identifies Buckels' name as the etymological source of the English word pickle. However, the Oxford English Dictionary provides "Middle Dutch pēkel, pēkele, (Dutch pekel)" and other language cognates, and does not mention Buckels.

The ending -sz in "Beuckelsz" is a patronymic, meaning "son of Beuckel".
