= Tobias =

Male given name

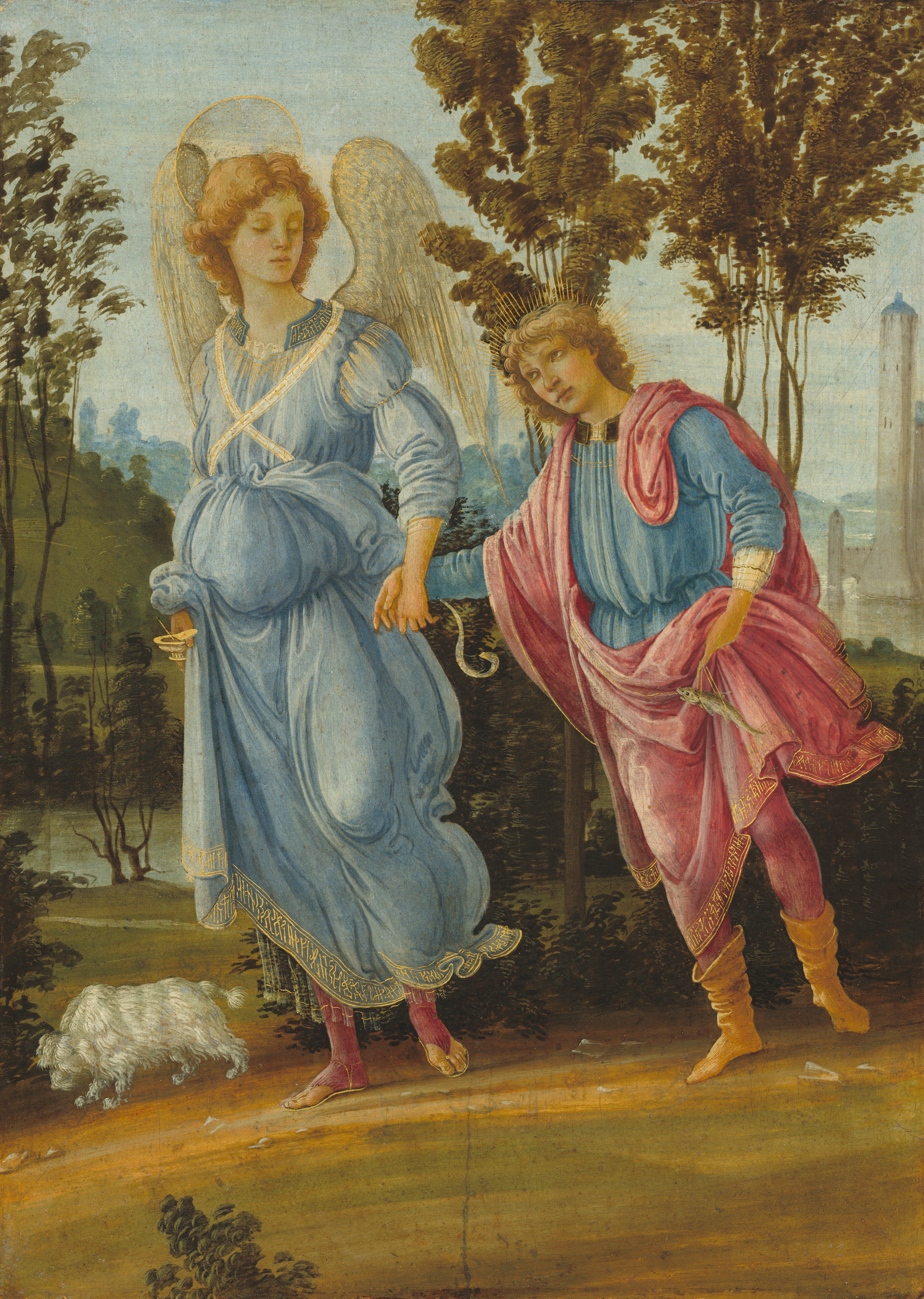
Tobias and the Angel, by Filippino Lippi

Tobias is the romanization into Latin letters of the Koine Greek name Τωβίας, which itself is a Hellenization of the Biblical Hebrew name טוֹבִיה, Toviyah, 'Yah is good'. It is the name of several minor Biblical figures as well as a major character in the Book of Tobit. Tobias is a common male given name in English-speaking, German-speaking, Dutch-speaking, and Scandinavian-language regions.

In English-speaking regions, it is often shortened to Toby or Tobey. In German, this name appears as Tobias or Tobi; in French as Tobie; and in Swedish as Tobias or Tobbe.

== In various languages ==
- Amharic: ጦቢያ (Ṭobiya)
- Burmese: တိုဘိယ (Tobiya)
- Catalan: Tobies
- Simplified Chinese: 托拜厄斯 (Tuōbàièsī)
- Traditional Chinese: :託比亞斯 (Tuōbǐyǎsī)
- Croatian: Tobijaš
- Czech: Tobiáš, Tobias
- Danish: Tobias
- Dutch: Tobias
- English: Tobias
- Finnish: Topias, Topi
- French: Tobie
- German: Tobias
- Greek: Τωβίας (Tobías, Tovias)
- Hebrew: טוֹבִיה (Tovyah, Tovia, Tuvya)
- Hungarian: Tóbiás
- Irish: Tóibias
- Italian: Tobia
- Kazakh: Тобиас (Tobïas)
- Kurdish: Tobîas
- Latgalian: Tobijas
- Lithuanian: Tobijas
- Maltese: Tobija
- Norwegian: Tobias
- Occitan: Tòbiàs
- Polish: Tobiasz
- Portuguese: Tobias
- Romanian: Tobie, Tobit
- Russian: Товий (Toviy)
- Serbian: Товија (Tovija)
- Slovak: Tobiáš
- Spanish: Tobías
- Swedish: Tobias
- Ukrainian: Товія (Toviya)
- Yiddish: טבֿיה (Tevye)

== People known by the mononym ==
People called Tobias, Tobiah, or Tobijah include:

- Tobias, son of Tobit, a Jewish man in the Book of Tobit who goes on a miraculous journey
  - Tobit, the father of Tobias; sometimes translated as "Tobias" himself in older sources such as the Vulgate and Douay–Rheims Bible
- Tobiah (Ammonite), an Ammonite official and opponent of Nehemiah in the Book of Nehemiah
- Tobiads, a Jewish faction active in Second Temple Period Judaism, notably during the Ptolemaic, Seleucid, and Maccabean eras; they claimed descent from a patriarch named Tobias
- Tobias, a legendary 3rd-century Christian martyr among Agapius, Atticus, Carterius, Styriacus, Tobias, Eudoxius, Nictopolion and companions
- Tobias of Jerusalem, a 2nd-century bishop of Jerusalem
- Tobias (bishop of Rochester) (died 726), an English bishop
- Tobijah, two persons mentioned in the Bible: a Levite in the reign of Jehoshaphat (2 Chronicles 17:8); and a Jew traveling from Babylon to Jerusalem with precious metal for Zerubbabel (Zechariah 6:10–14).

== People with given name ==
- Tobias (footballer, born 1949) (1949–2024), Brazilian footballer
- Tobias Abse (born 1956 or 1957), British historian
- Tobias Abstreiter (born 1970), German ice hockey center
- Tobias Angerer (born 1977), German cross country skier
- Tobias Arlt (born 1987), German luger
- Tobias Bamberg (1875–1963), Dutch magician
- Tobias Barreto (1839–1889), Brazilian poet and philosopher
- Tobias Beer (born 1976), English actor
- Tobias Bernstrup (born 1970), Swedish contemporary artist
- Tobias Billström (born 1973), Swedish politician
- Tobias Bjarneby (born 1974), Swedish video game journalist
- Tobias de Boer (1930–2016), Dutch scientist
- Tobias Bogner (born 1990), German ski jumper
- Tobias Bonhoeffer (born 1960), German-American neurobiologist
- Tobias Bridge (fl. 17th century), English soldier and officer
- Tobias S. Buckell (born 1979), Grenadian-American science fiction author
- Tobias Capwell (born c. 1973), American military historian
- Tobias Carlsson (footballer, born 1975), Swedish footballer defender
- Tobias Carlsson (footballer, born 1995), Swedish footballer defender
- Tobías Zúñiga Castro (1854–1918), Costa Rican politician
- Tobias Cohn (1652–1729), Polish physician
- Tobias Cole (born 1971), Australian opera singer and countertenor
- Tobias Cremer (born 1992), German politician
- Tobias Joaquim Dai (born 1950), Mozambican politician
- Tobias Dantzig (1884–1956), Russian-American mathematician
- Tobias Delius (born 1964), British-German musician and saxophonist
- Tobias Dier (born 1976), German golfer
- Tobias Dorzon (born 1984), American chef
- Tobias Druitt, pseudonym of the authors Diane Purkiss and Michael Dowling
- Tobiah ben Eliezer (fl. 11th century), poet and Talmud commentator
- Tobias Ebenberger (born 1990), German politician
- Tobias Ellwood (born 1966), British politician and soldier
- Tobias Enhus, Swedish composer
- Tobias Enström (born 1984), Swedish hockey defenceman
- Tobias Exxel (born 1973), German bass player for the band Edguy
- Tobias Forge (born 1981), Swedish musician in the band Ghost
- Tobias Forsberg (born 1988), Swedish hockey player winger
- Tobias Frere-Jones (born 1970), American type designer
- Tobias Furneaux (1735–1781), British Royal Navy officer
- Tobias Geffen (1870–1970), American rabbi
- Tobias Gentleman (fl. 1614), English mariner and writer
- Tobias Grahn (born 1980), Swedish footballer midfielder
- Tobias Grünenfelder (born 1977), Swiss alpine skier
- Tobias Guddal (born 2002), Norwegian footballer
- Tobias Harris (born 1992), American NBA basketball player
- Tobias Hecht (born 1964), American anthropologist, ethnographer, and translator
- Tobías Hernández (born 1958), Venezuelan MLB baseball player and catcher
- Tobias Hill (1970–2023), British poet and novelist
- Tobias Hoesl (born 1961), German television actor
- Tobias Holmqvist (born 1988), Swedish footballer and striker
- Tobias Hume (c. 1579 – 1645), Scottish composer & soldier
- Tobias Hysén (born 1982), Swedish footballer forward
- Tobias Jensen (born 2004), Danish basketballer
- Tobias Jesso Jr. (born 1985), Canadian musician
- Tobias Jones (writer), British author and journalist
- Tobias Jonsson (born 1996), Swedish Paralympic athlete
- Tobias Justin (born 1996), Indonesian YouTuber
- Tobias Jørgensen (born 2000), Danish Paralympic equestrian
- Tobias Kamke (born 1986), German tennis player
- Tobias Karkulowski (born 2004), Finnish footballer and defender
- Tobias Karlsson (songwriter), Swedish record producer
- Tobias Kassung (born 1977), German classical guitarist and composer
- Tobias Krantz (born 1971), Swedish politician
- Tobías Lasser (1911–2006), Venezuelan botanist
- Tobias Lear V (1762–1816), American secretary
- Tobias Levels (born 1986), German-Dutch footballer
- Tobias Lindemann (born 1966), German architect, designer and media entrepreneur
- Tobias Linderoth (born 1979), Swedish football midfielder and manager
- Tobias Lohner (1619-1697), Austrian Jesuit theologian
- Tobias Mabuta Munihango (born 1983), Namibian amateur boxer
- Tobias "Tobey" Maguire (born 1975), American actor and film producer
- Tobias Matthay (1858–1945), English pianist and composer
- Tobias Matthew (1546–1628), English Anglican archbishop of York
- Tobias Mayer (1723–1762), German astronomer
- Tobias Mealey (1823–1904), American early settler of Minnesota
- Tobias Mehler (born 1976), Canadian actor
- Tobias Menzies (born 1974), English actor
- Tobias Michael Carel Asser (1838–1913), Dutch lawyer and legal scholar
- Tobias Mikaelsson (born 1988), Swedish football player
- Tobias Mikkelsen (born 1986), Danish football player
- Tobias Moretti (born 1959), Austrian actor
- Tobias Mullen (1818-1900), Irish-born clergyman of the Roman Catholic Church, Bishop of Erie
- Tobias Müller (disambiguation)
- Tobias Nath (born 1979), German television actor
- Tobias Nickenig (born 1984), German footballer
- Tobias Nicklas (born 1967), German scholar of religion
- Tobias Norris (1861–1936), Canadian politician
- Tobias Picker (born 1954), American composer and pianist
- Tobias Pflüger (born 1965), German politician
- Tobias A. Plants (1811–1887), U.S. Representative from Ohio
- Tobias Pock (1609-1683), Austrian Baroque painter
- Tobias Pullen (1648–1713), Irish bishop
- Tobias Rahim (born 1989), Danish singer and poet
- Tobias Rathgeb (born 1982), German football midfielder
- Tobias Rau (born 1981), German footballer left back
- Tobias Read (born 1975), American politician and member of the Oregon House of Representatives
- Tobias Regner (born 1982), German singer and guitarist
- Tobias Reinhardt (born 1971), German classical scholar
- Tobias Rustat (c. 1606-1694), English courtier to Charles II
- Tobias Sammet (born 1977), German musician and vocalist of Edguy
- Tobias Schanfarber (1862–1942), American rabbi
- Tobias Schellenberg (born 1978), German diver
- Tobias Schenke (born 1981), German actor
- Tobias Schiegl (born 1973), Austrian luger
- Tobias Schneebaum (1922–2005), American artist and activist
- Tobias Schneider (born 1981), German speedskater
- Tobias Schönenberg (born 1986), German actor and film director
- Tobias Schweinsteiger (born 1982), German footballer forward
- Tobias Simon (1929–1982), Canadian-American civil rights lawyer
- Tobias Sippel (born 1988), German footballer goalkeeper
- Tobias Sjokvist (born 1995), Swedish ice hockey player
- Tobias Smedberg (born 1978), Swedish politician
- Tobias Smith (born 2003), known by the screenname Tubbo, an English Minecraft streamer
- Tobias Smollett (1721–1771), Scottish author and surgeon
- Tobias Steinhauser (born 1972), German cyclist
- Tobias Sten (born 2003), Norwegian country singer and songwriter
- Tobias Stephan (born 1984), Swiss hockey goaltender
- Tobias Stimmer (1539–1584), Swiss painter and illustrator
- Tobias Summerer (born 1983), German tennis player
- Tobias Tal (1847–1898), Dutch rabbi
- Tobias Tornkvist (born 1994), Swedish ice hockey player
- Tobias Truvillion (born 1975), American actor and model
- Tobias Unger (born 1979), German track-and-field athlete
- Tobias Verhaecht (1561–1631), draughtsman from Antwerp
- Tobias Verwey (born 1981), Namibian cricketer
- Tobias Viklund (born 1986), Swedish ice hockey defenceman
- Tobias Weis (born 1985), German footballer
- Tobias Wendl (born 1987), German luger
- Tobias Whitaker (fl. 1634–1661), English physician
- Tobias Willi (born 1979), German football player
- Tobias Wilner (born 1976), Danish musician and composer
- Tobias Wolff (born 1945), American writer

== Fictional characters with the given name ==
- Tobias Beckett, a criminal in the 2018 film Solo: A Star Wars Story and mentor to Han Solo
- Tobias Beecher, a prisonor from the 1997 TV series Oz
- Tobias Eaton, the protagonist in the Divergent series of novels by Veronica Roth
- Tobias Fornell, an FBI special agent on the CBS show NCIS
- Tobias Fünke, a character on the 2003 sitcom Arrested Development
- Tobias Gregson, a Scotland Yard inspector in a number of the "Sherlock Holmes" novels
- Tobias Jones, a detective from the Driver video games
- Tobias Ragg, an apprentice barber in the musical Sweeney Todd
- Tobias Snape, father of Severus Snape from the Harry Potter series
- Tobias Whale, a criminal kingpin and villain in DC comics
- Tobias Wilson, character on The Amazing World of Gumball
- Jeff Tobias Winger, a character on the 2009 sitcom Community
- Tobias 'Toby' Ziegler, the White House Communications Director in the TV drama The West Wing

== See also ==
- Tobias (surname)
- Tobais
