= Tobias (surname) =

The surname Tobias derives from the Greek form (Τοβίας) of the Hebrew male given name "Tovya" טוביה, meaning "God is good". In the Old Testament of the Bible, Tobias is the hero of the Book of Tobit who defeats a demon with archangel Raphael's help.

Notable people with the name include:

- Andrew Tobias (born 1947), American journalist and writer
- Channing Heggie Tobias (1882–1961), American civil rights activist
- Charles Tobias (1898–1970), American songwriter
- Donna Tobias (1952–2010), American diver
- Douglas Tobias, American chemist
- Errol Tobias (born 1950), South African rugby union player
- Fred Tobias, American songwriter
- George Tobias (1901–1980), American actor
- George Tobias, Anglican bishop
- Gert Tobias (born 1973), Romanian artist
- Harry Tobias (1895–1994), American songwriter
- Herbert Tobias (1924–1982), German photographer
- Isabella Tobias (born 1991), American ice dancer
- Jenny Kendall-Tobias (born 1967), British radio journalist
- Jesse Tobias (born 1972), American guitarist
- John Tobias (born 1969), American graphic artist and video game designer
- Ken Tobias (1945–2024), Canadian singer and songwriter
- Manoel Tobias (born 1971), Brazilian futsal player
- Michael Tobias (born 1951), American environmentalist and filmmaker
- Murray Tobias (born 1939), Australian judge
- Nataliya Tobias (born 1980), Ukrainian runner
- Oliver Tobias (born 1947), British actor
- Paul Tobias (born 1963), American guitarist
- Pavel Tobiáš (born 1955), Czech football player and manager
- Phillip V. Tobias (1925–2012), South African palaeoanthropologist
- Randall L. Tobias (born 1942), former CEO of Eli Lilly and Company, and first United States Global AIDS Coordinator
- Rudolf Tobias (1873–1918), Estonian composer
- Szidi Tobias (born 1967), Slovak actress and musician
- Timothy J. Tobias (1952–2006), American composer
- Todd Tobias (born 1967), American musician and record producer
- Uwe Tobias (born 1973), Romanian artist

== See also ==
- Tobia (name)
