= Moray Firth fishing disaster =

August 1848 disaster in Scotland

Coordinates: 57.695°N 3.604°W

The Moray Firth fishing disaster of August 1848 was one of the worst fishing disasters in maritime history on the east coast of Scotland, and was caused by a severe storm that struck the Moray Firth. The event led to widespread improvements to harbours and significant changes to the design of fishing boats over the remainder of the 19th century.

== Fishing history ==
The cover of Captain Washington's 1849 Report into the causes of the disaster.

Scottish fishing boats of the late 18th and early 19th centuries were generally small sail boats with open hulls that mainly fished close to shore. The shallow design of the boats allowed them to be launched by their crew from beaches or small harbours, but their open hull provided little shelter for the crew and made them susceptible to swamping and capsizing in rough seas.

Dutch fishermen had been fishing for herring in the North Sea from the 15th century, and had developed a large scale system of "Buss" fishing in deeper waters using large boats which stayed at sea for several weeks and cured the fish aboard the vessels. To compete with this method, the Government of the day introduced a bounty system which initially rewarded fishermen for using larger vessels, but later paid the bounty based on the size of catch. This led to a gradual increase in the size of fishing vessel operating from the East Coast harbours, although open hulls were still favoured because this allowed the maximum possible catch to be accommodated.

== The storm and its aftermath ==
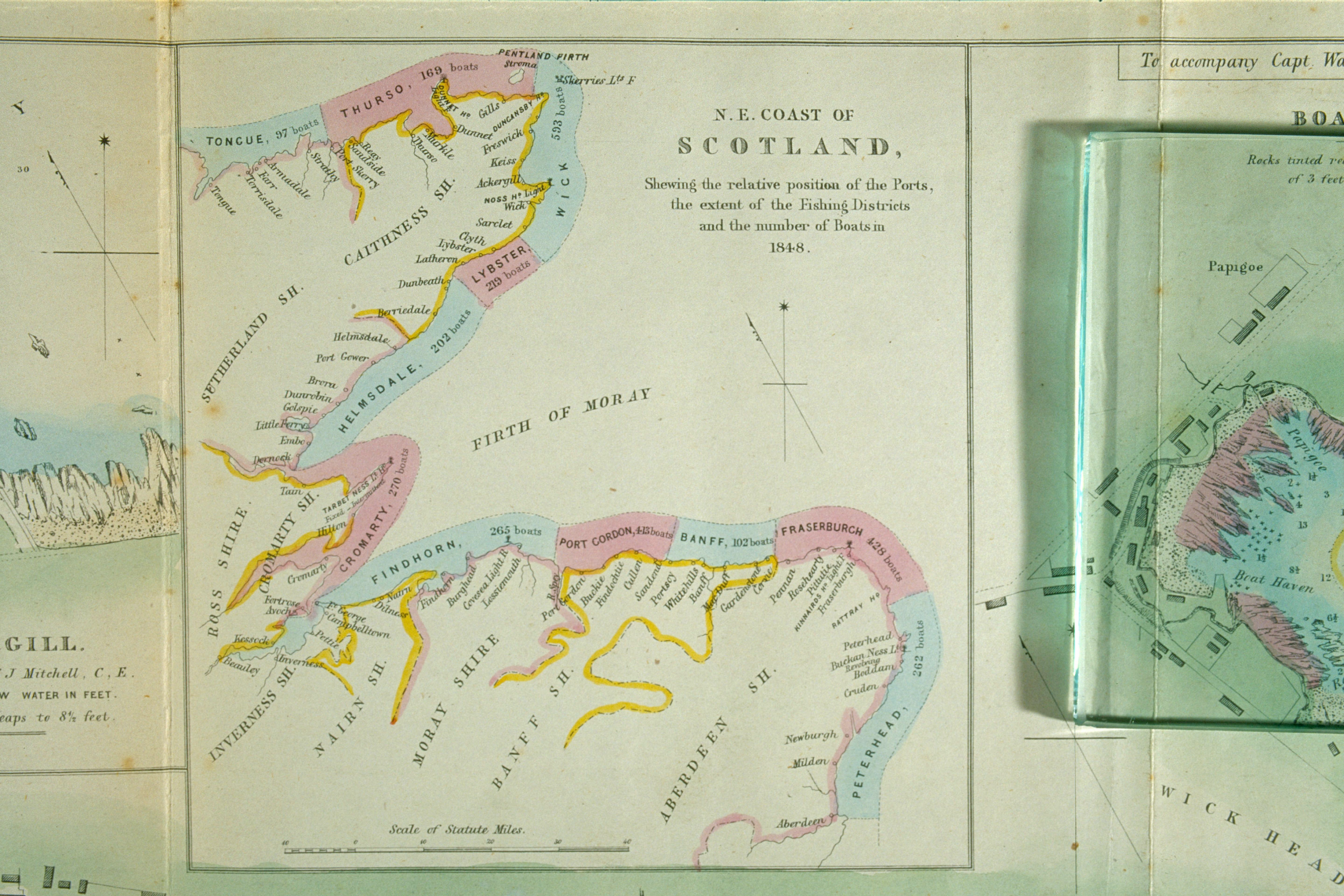
A map charting the distribution of fishing boats, from the Washington Report. Wick is the busiest with 543 boats, followed by Fraserburgh.

The weather on the afternoon of 18 August was favourable, promising good fishing and, from Wick to Stonehaven, around 800 boats set out to sea to gather the day's herring catch. By midnight the weather was deteriorating rapidly with strengthening winds and increasingly heavy seas. Many skippers decided to haul their nets and make for shelter. During the following storm, 124 boats were lost, many while trying to enter harbour, and 100 fishermen lost their lives, leaving behind 47 widows and 161 children.

In the aftermath of the storm, the Government appointed Captain John Washington of the Admiralty to conduct an inquiry into the tragedy and make recommendations for safety improvements in the fishing industry. His report, entitled Report on the loss of life, and damage caused to fishing boats on the East Coast of Scotland, in the gale of 19 August 1848, was presented to the House of Commons in 1849. Washington came to two main conclusions: firstly, that the open-hulled design of the fishing boats was deficient, leading to their susceptibility to swamping in heavy seas, and was a significant factor in the tragedy; secondly, that there was a shortage of good quality harbours accessible to fishing vessels in all tidal conditions.

A proposal by naval architect James Peake for an improved fishing boat design, from the Washington Report.

Washington's recommendations led to a programme of improvements to the many small harbours around the east coast of Scotland. The Fishery Board for Scotland also encouraged the introduction of decked vessels. The main types of boat used for herring fishing on the east coast were the Fifie, and the smaller Skaffie which was common around the Moray Firth. Fishermen initially resisted the introduction of decks because it reduced the space available for the catch, and they also feared that a deck would increase the risk of men being swept overboard.

Gradually, the provision of decks on the boats became more common, which led to a further increase in boat size to compensate for the reduced space for the catch. In addition to decks, new boats were being built with a small forecastle in the bow, which contained bunks and provided shelter for the fishermen. This evolution in boat design led to the introduction of the Baldie in 1860 and the Zulu in 1879. By the end of the century all the east coast fishing vessels were fully decked.

== See also ==
- Maritime history of Scotland
- Eyemouth Disaster
- Scottish East Coast Fishery
