= Nicotra =

Nicotra is a surname. Notable people with the surname include:

- Angelo Nicotra (1948–2024), Italian actor and dubber, brother of Giancarlo
- Benedetto Nicotra (born 1953), Italian politician, member of the Chamber of Deputies from 2001 to 2006
- Benedetto Vincenzo Nicotra (1933–2018), Italian politician, member of the Chamber of Deputies from 1983 to 1994
- Giancarlo Nicotra (1944–2013), Italian television actor and director, brother of Angelo
- Tobia Nicotra, prolific Italian forger
