= Cologne Classical Ensemble =

The Cologne Classical Ensemble (in German: Kölner Klassik Ensemble) was formed by graduates of the Hochschule für Musik Köln in 2003. With over 30 concerts per year it has become a renowned ensemble for classical music. Founder and Artistic Director of the ensemble is Tobias Kassung. The basic formation of the Cologne Classical Ensemble consists of three violins, viola, cello, double-bass, guitar and piano. Especially their recording of classical arrangements of music by Ástor Piazzolla for Sony Classical became popular.
