= Maritime history of Scotland =

The Maritime history of Scotland involves events including shipping, ports, navigation, and seamen, as well as marine sciences, exploration, trade, and maritime themes in the arts of Scotland.

== Royal Scots Navy ==
The Scottish Red Ensign, flown by ships of the Royal Scots Navy

James I was responsible for developing the shipping interests of the country, establishing a shipbuilding yard at Leith. His successor, James II, developed the use of gunpowder and artillery in Scotland and, in consequence, ships were built with hulls thick enough to resist artillery, and with high forecastles to carry guns. The pioneer in Scotland's newer type of warship was Bishop Kennedy of St. Andrews who was responsible for the building of the St Salvator, which cost £10,000. James IV continued the policy of building up the navy, having 38 ships built for his fleet and founding two new dockyards. His greatest achievement was the construction of Great Michael, the largest ship up to that time launched in Scotland, the building of which cost £30,000.

As Scotland and England moved closer during the seventeenth century, following the Union of the Crowns, the need for a navy to protect Scotland from the English Royal Navy lessened and by the time of the Union with England in 1707, the Royal Scottish Navy possessed just three ships: The Royal William, The Royal Mary, and Dumbarton Castle.

== Famous ships ==
In the 19th and 20th centuries, the River Clyde had been a very important place in the world for building ships, with about 30,000 ships being built there.

=== Great Michael ===
The Great Michael was launched in 1511. She weighed 1,000 tons, was 240 feet (73 m) in length, was manned by 1,000 seamen and 120 gunners and was then the largest ship in Europe (according to the chronicler Lindsay of Pitscottie). She had Sir Andrew Wood as quartermaster and Robert Barton as skipper. The ship was sold to France in 1514.

=== Cutty Sark ===
The Cutty Sark was a clipper ship built in 1869 in Dumbarton, Scotland, to carry 600 tons of cargo. She raced the Thermopylae and other clippers in the tea trade from China and later in the wool trade from Australia. She was capable of sailing at over 17 knots (31 km/h). Built as a full-rigged ship, she spent her final trading years as a barquentine. She was dismasted in 1916 but restored in 1922 then used as a training ship. Cutty Sark was taken over by a preservation society in 1952 and moved to Greenwich. In 2007 she was damaged by fire during restoration work but is to be repaired.

=== Queen Mary ===
RMS Queen Mary was built in 1936 by John Brown & Company in Clydebank, Scotland, for what is now the Cunard Line. She made runs across the Atlantic between Southampton, Cherbourg and New York City in partnership with Queen Elizabeth. The Queen Mary was used as a troop ship in the Second World War, carrying 16,082 people on one voyage. After the war she resumed Atlantic runs but these became loss making. She was withdrawn from service in 1967 and is now in Long Beach California as a hotel and tourist attraction.

=== HMY Britannia ===
HMY Britannia is the former Royal Yacht of the British royal family, the 83rd such vessel since the restoration of King Charles II in 1660. She is the second Royal yacht to bear the name, the first being the famous racing cutter built for The Prince of Wales in 1893. She is now permanently moored as an exhibition ship at Ocean Terminal, Leith, Edinburgh, Scotland. Built at the shipyard of John Brown & Co. Ltd in Clydebank, West Dunbartonshire, she was launched by Her Majesty Queen Elizabeth II on 16 April 1953 and commissioned on 11 January 1954. The ship was designed with three masts, a 133-foot (41 m) foremast, a 139-foot (42 m) mainmast, and a 118-foot (36 m) mizzenmast. The top 20 feet (6.1 m) of the foremast and mainmast were hinged, to allow the ship to pass under bridges.

=== The Mighty Hood ===
HMS Hood was the flagship of the Royal Navy between the Wars.

=== Comet ===
Built in 1812, PS Comet was the first commercially successful steamboat in Europe.

=== RMS Lusitania ===
RMS Lusitania was famously sunk by a U-boat, presaging the entry of the USA into the First World War.

=== Several Queen Elizabeths ===
HMS Queen Elizabeth (R08), the new aircraft carrier, and her sister ship HMS Prince of Wales (R09). Also Queen Elizabeth 2 and RMS Queen Elizabeth. Note that these are named after a number of different Queen Elizabeths.

=== HMS Duke of York ===
HMS Duke of York (17) winner of the last battleship action in European waters.

=== RRS Discovery ===
RRS Discovery Antarctic explorer, built at Dundee.

=== Honourable mentions ===
- SS Californian (didn't rescue the Titanic)
- MY Steve Irwin (from the TV show Whale Wars)
- Rainbow Warrior (1955) (sunk in New Zealand by the French)
- RFA Engadine (K08) (served in the Falklands Conflict)
- Japanese battleship Asahi (one of many foreign warships)
- HMS Argus (I49) (the original aircraft carrier)
- CSS Robert E. Lee (Confederate blockade runner)
- CS Mackay-Bennett (notable cable ship which collected the bodies of the people not rescued by Californian)
- RMS Lancastria (greatest loss of life in British maritime history)
- HMS Repulse (1916) (sunk by air attack along with HMS Prince of Wales)
- MV San Demetrio (subject of the 1943 feature film)
- RFA Sir Galahad (1966) (bombed in the Falklands conflict)

== Maritime disasters ==
- Eyemouth disaster
- Moray Firth fishing disaster

== See also ==
- Maritime history
- Maritime history of Europe
- Maritime history of the United Kingdom
- List of ports and harbours in Scotland
