= Tobais =

Tobais is both a surname and a given name. Notable people with the name include:

- Deji Tobais (born 1991), British sprinter
- Tobais Palmer (born 1990), American football player

== See also ==
- Tobias
