= Tobia (name) =

Tobia is a Greek-origin word which is used as a surname and a masculine given name. People with the name include:

== Surname ==
- Blaise Tobia (born 1953), American artist and photographer
- Jacob Tobia (born 1991), American LGBT rights activist and television personality
- John Tobia (born 1978), American politician

== Given name ==
- Tobia Aoun (1803–1871), Lebanese Maronite Catholic bishop
- Tobia Bocchi (born 1997), Italian athlete
- Tobia Lionelli (1647–1714), Slovene–Italian preacher and writer
- Tobia Giuseppe Loriga (born 1977), Italian boxer
- Tobia Masini (born 1976), Italian racing driver
- Tobia Nicotra, Italian document forger
- Tobia Polese (1865–1905), Italian painter

== See also ==
- Tobias, list of people with the given name
- Tobia (disambiguation)
