= Tobia =

Tobia or Tobía may refer to:

- Tobia (name), list of people with the name
- Tobia, Estonia, village in Rakvere Parish, Lääne-Viru County, Estonia
- Baños de Río Tobía, manucipality in Spain
- Tobía, village in La Rioja, Spain
- Tobia, wine grape variety better known as Malvasia
- I ragazzi di padre Tobia, Italian television series
- Il ritorno di Tobia, oratorio by Joseph Haydn
- Schinia tobia, moth of the family Noctuidae
