= Tobias Whitaker =

English physician

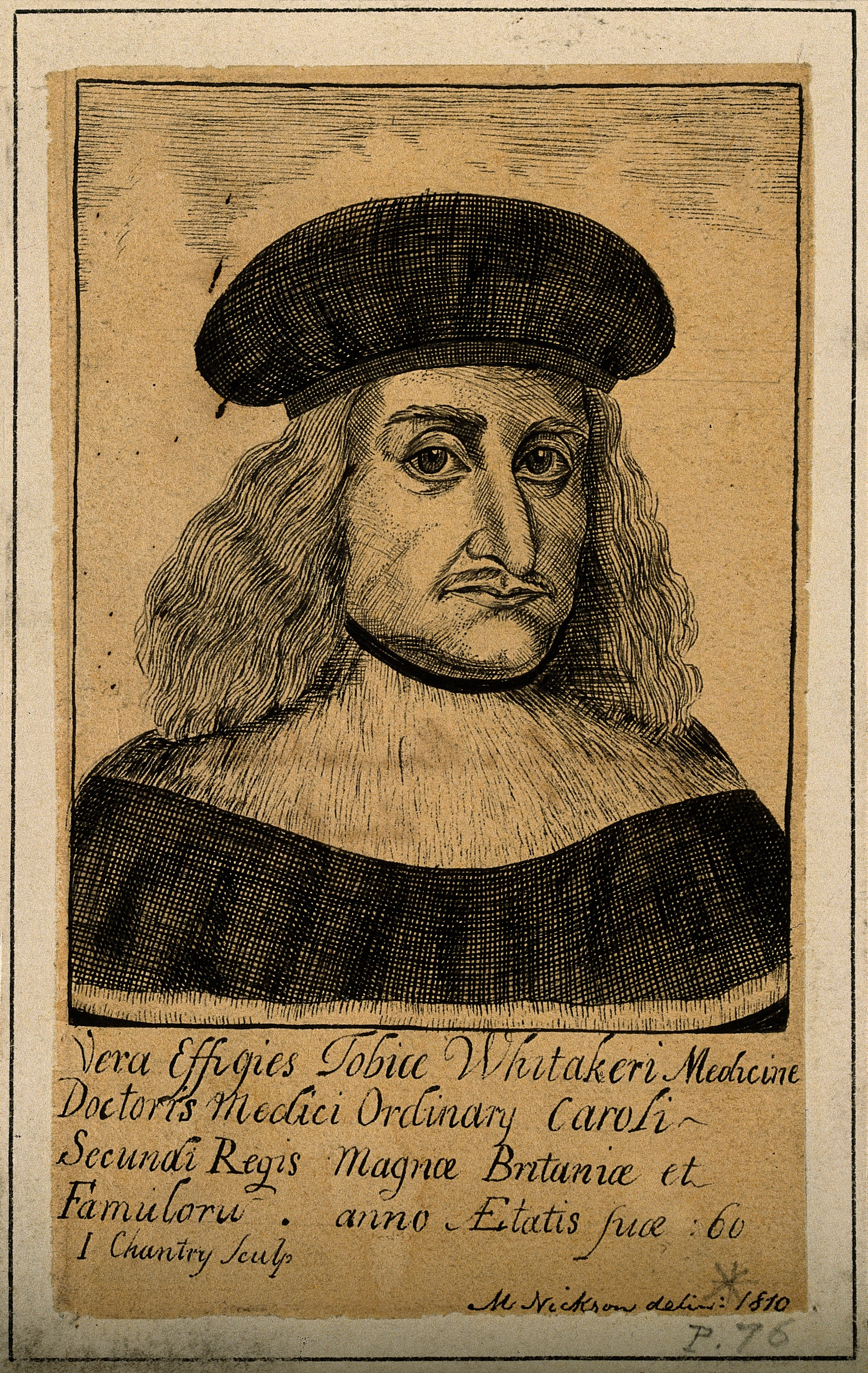
- Born: 1600 or 1601?
- Died: 1666
- Occupation: Physician

Tobias Whitaker (fl. 1634–1661) was an English physician.

== Biography ==
Whitaker was born probably in 1600 or 1601. He practised physic first in Norwich, and in 1634, while residing in that town, published ‘Περὶ ὑδροπωσιας,’ London, 12mo. Between 1634 and 1638 he went to London, and in 1638 brought out his most important work, ‘The Tree of Humane Life, or the Bloud of the Grape, proving the Possibilitie of maintaining Humane Life from Infancy to Extreame Old Age, without any Sicknesse, by the Use of Wine’ (London, 8vo). This defence of wine, which he regarded as a universal remedy against disease, was republished in 1654, and translated into Latin under the title ‘De Sanguine Uvæ’ (Frankfort, 1655, 8vo; Hague, 1660, 1663, 12mo). In September 1660 he was appointed physician in ordinary to the royal household with a salary of 50l. a year (Cal. State Papers, Dom. 1660–1, p. 281). In 1661 he published ‘An Elenchus of Opinions concerning the Smallpox,’ London, 12mo, to which was prefixed his portrait engraved by John Chantrey; another edition appeared in 1671. Whitaker died early in 1666, before 21 May (cf. ib. 1664–5 p. 129, 1665–6 p. 406).

‘The Tree of Life’ is ascribed by Wood to William Whitaker, a candidate of the Royal College of Physicians, who died in the parish of St. Clement Danes in January 1670-1 (Wood, Fasti Oxon., ed. Bliss, ii. 178; Foster, Alumni Oxon., 1500–1714; Munk, Royal Coll. of Phys. i. 268).
