= Tobias Müller =

Tobias Müller may refer to:

- Tobias Müller (cyclist) (born 2004), German road and track cyclist
- Tobias Müller (footballer, born 1989), Swiss football midfielder
- Tobias Müller (footballer, born 1993), German football midfielder/forward
- Tobias Müller (footballer, born 1994), German football defender
- Tobias Müller (racing driver), German racing driver
- Tobias Müller (skier), German freestyle skier
