= Douglas Tobias =

American chemist

- Born: Douglas James Tobias
- Education: University of California, Riverside; Carnegie Mellon University
- Awards: Theoretical Chemistry Award from the American Chemical Society's Division of Physical Chemistry (2014); Soft Matter and Biophysical Chemistry Award from the Royal Society of Chemistry (2017)
- Scientific career
- Fields: Biophysical chemistry; Computational chemistry
- Institutions: University of California, Irvine
- Thesis: The formation and stability of protein folding initiation structures (1991)
- Doctoral advisor: Charles L. Brooks III

Douglas James Tobias is an American chemist who is professor and chair of the department of chemistry at the University of California, Irvine. His research is in the fields of biophysical, theoretical, and computational chemistry. He was elected a fellow of the American Association for the Advancement of Science in 2006. He was elected a fellow of the American Chemical Society in 2013 and of the American Physical Society in 2014. In 2014, he received the Theoretical Chemistry Award from the American Chemical Society's Division of Physical Chemistry, and in 2017, he received the Soft Matter and Biophysical Chemistry Award from the Royal Society of Chemistry.
