= Tobias Lindemann =

German architect, designer and media entrepreneur

Tobias Lindemann (born 1966) is a German architect, designer and media entrepreneur. He is the youngest of three children of Oskar Lindemann, a Protestant minister of the Evangelische Kirche in Deutschland. The Lindemann family has its roots in Baden Württemberg and is widespread, with family members living in Australia, U.S. and Canada.

Lindemann started his career as photographer and industrial designer in the late 80s. After finishing his Diploma and Master in architecture and building technology 1993 at the Technische Universität Berlin, he worked as design architect, project architect and managing director, leading design development teams of engineers on small to large scale projects ranging from residential buildings to airports. 1996 he founded Lindemann Architects and received awards for a variety of projects and successful architectural competitions.

Lindemann developed DESIGN TV (DTV) as Europe's first premium Mobile / IPTV / Pay TV channel to promote brands, architecture, design, fashion and photography. DESIGN TV started first brand projects in 2000 and launched 2003 in Germany supported by the European Union EFRE. As Chairman of DESIGN TV Media Group he innovated and designed future IPTV, mobile and content strategies while creating new DESIGN TV start-up operations in Europe and Asia.

Tobias Lindemann invented a non-profit organization sponsoring a European platform for architecture, design and media together with the embassies in Berlin and served as Chairman of the Designers Friday Foundation Deutschland (DFD) which was later transformed to Design Foundation Europe. The foundation has the mission to support design excellence in education and identify talents, trends and visions to perform future projects as well as worldwide summits to serve the international creative industries and develop sustainable solutions for a better environment.

Lindemann has been nominated for the T-Com Inspire!Awards, awarding entrepreneurs who innovate and inspire Germany and the Montreaux Golden Award. He accompanied the German delegation which visited China and Japan on the invitation of the former German Chancellor Gerhard Schröder. Tobias Lindemann is a member of the German NRW Chamber of Architects (Architektenkammer Nordrhein – Westfalen) and the Architects Registration Board.
