= Gert & Uwe Tobias =

Romanian twin woodcut and collage artists

Gert Tobias and Uwe Tobias (born 1973) are twin brothers working as a collaborative duo of visual artists.

The brothers were born in Braşov, Romania; they live and work in Cologne. They are known for their woodcut prints as well as relief sculptures, and drawings using typewriters, watercolours and ceramics. Their work centres on their Romanian heritage and the myth and legend that is associated with that area, such as the story of Dracula. They combine their native history with elements of contemporary graphic design, camp horror films and abstract art.

An untitled installation shown at the Frieze Art Fair in 2007 paired shuffleboard motifs with Russian Constructivism's aesthetics while suggesting several variations of a creation story as its subjects. It consisted of preliminary drawings made using a typewriter threaded with black and red ribbon, collages, ceramic trophy figurines, and large color woodblock prints on paper. This installation was remounted by Team Gallery at their Wooster Street location in 2012.

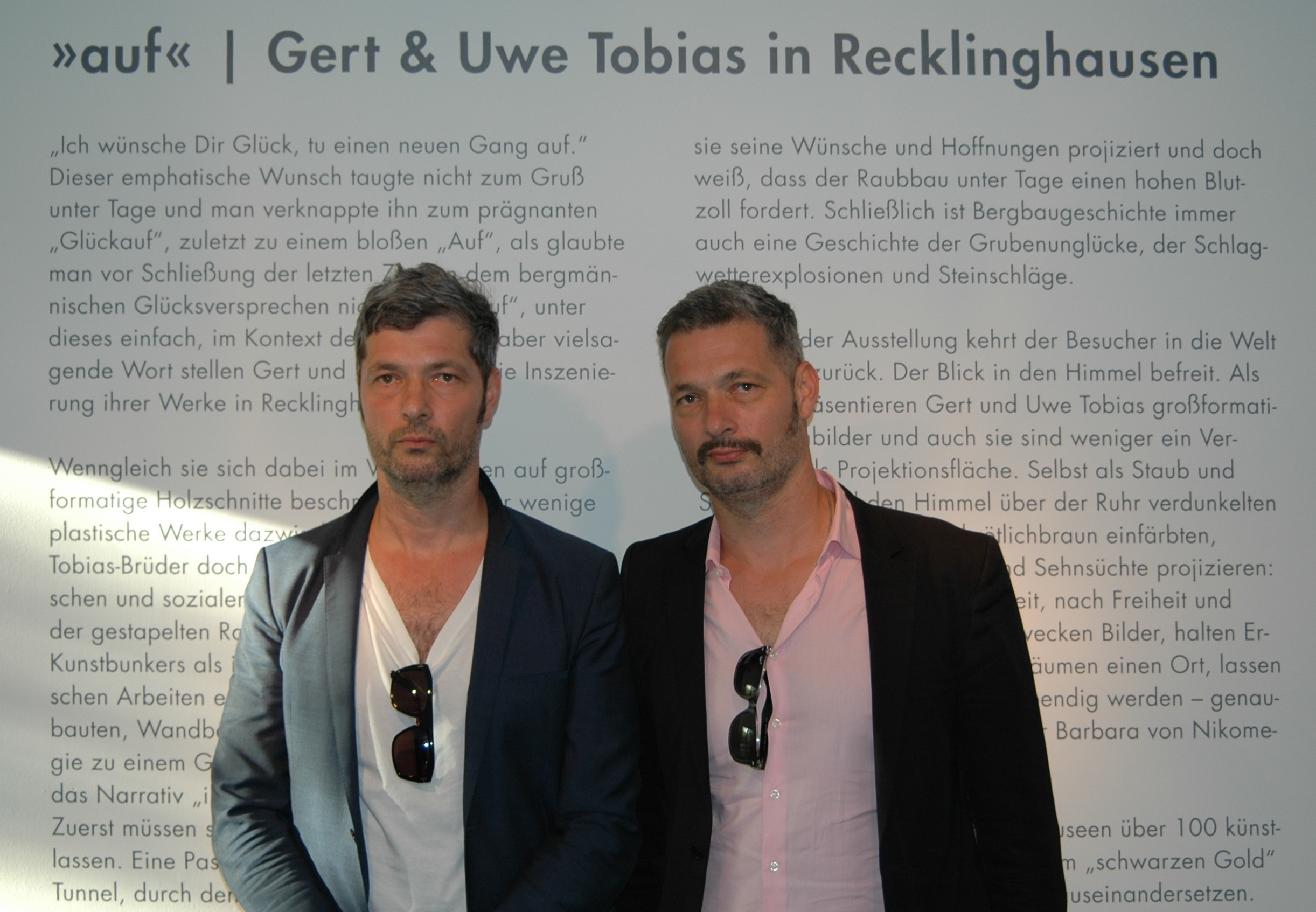
Artists, Gert und Uwe Tobias

== Selected exhibitions ==
2004

- Kunstverein e.V., Cologne

2005

- Dead / Undead, Galerie Six Friedrich Lisa Ungar, Munich
- 7, Simon Lee Gallery, London
- Roswitha meets Dionysos, The Breeder Projects, Athens

2006

- Loveless, Team Gallery, New York
- Hammer Museum, Los Angeles

2007

- If You Build It, They Will Come, Brukenthal Museum, Sibiu
- Return to Form, Patricia Low Contemporary, Gstaad
- Projects 86, Museum of Modern Art, New York
- Made in Germany - Aktuelle Kunst aus Deutschland, Sprengel Museum Hannover, Hannover

2008

- Kunstmuseum Bonn, Bonn

2010

- Exhibiting with photographer Diane Arbus at Nottingham Contemporary from 17 July till 3 October 2010. {Link }

2011

- Gemeentemuseum, The Hague, Netherlands

2012

- Gert & Uwe Tobias, Kunstverein Hamburg, Hamburg, Germany

2013

- Gert & Uwe Tobias, Whitechapel Gallery, London, UK

== Bibliography ==
- Rhoda Eitel-Porter, "Gert & Uwe Tobias". Print Quarterly, XXX, no. 3, September 2013, pp. 361–365.
