= Tobias Kassung =

German classical guitarist and composer (born 1977)

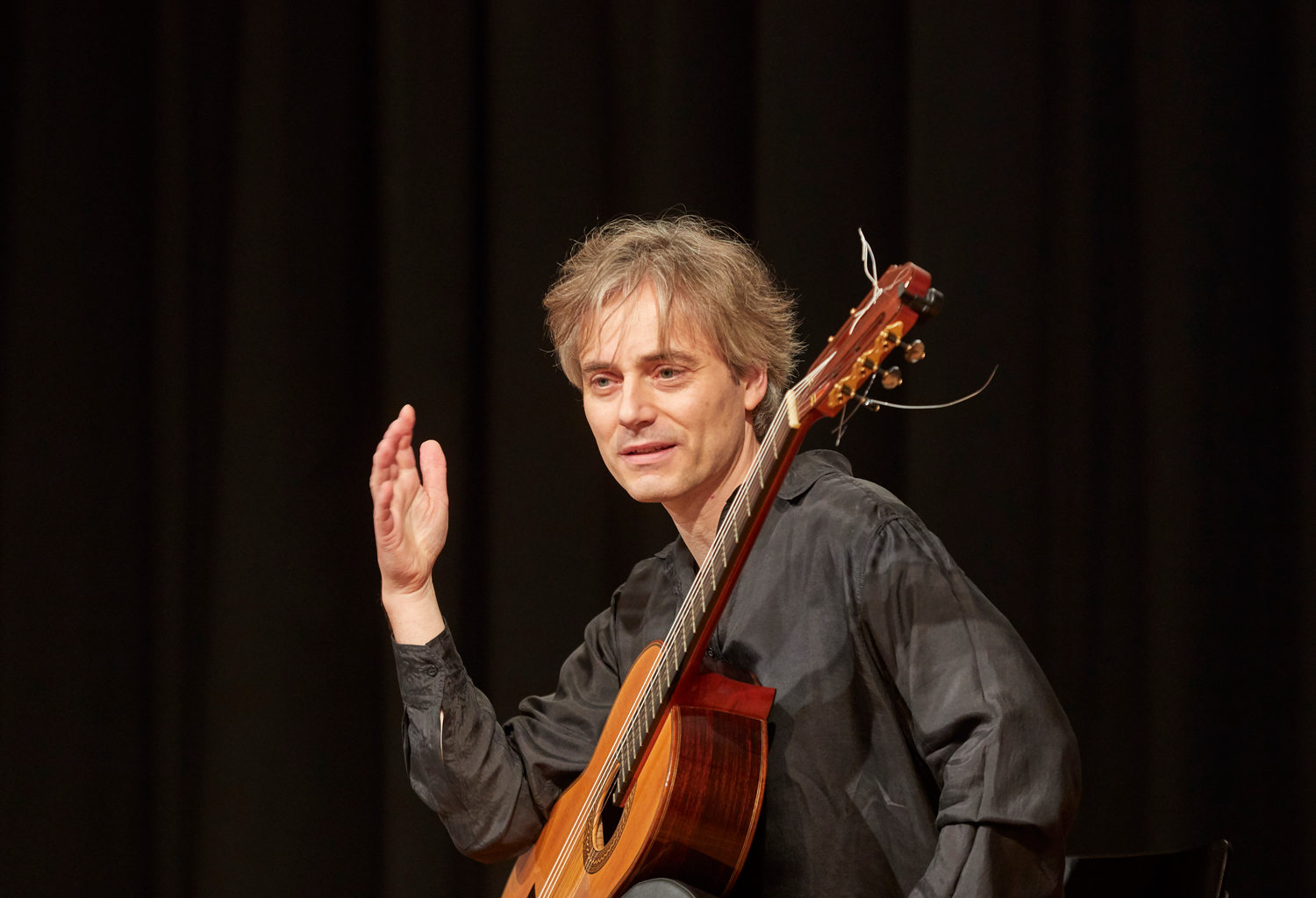
Tobias Kassung live in concert, Cologne, 2021

Tobias Kassung (born 1977) is a German classical guitarist and composer.

He studied with Prof. Hubert Käppel at the Hochschule für Musik Köln and continued his studies with Simon Dinnigan at the UCE Birmingham Conservatoire of Music and with Antigoni Goni at the Conservatoire royal de Bruxelles.

He is founder and Artistic Director of the Cologne Classical Ensemble (Kölner Klassik Ensemble). Between 2005 and 2008 he was appointed lecturer at the University of Cologne. In 2009 he founded, with Hubert Käppel KSG Exaudio, a new label especially for guitar music. He is performing as soloist, with the Cologne Classical Ensemble, the Astor Trio and in different duo combinations. He has released recordings with Sony Classical and KSG Exaudio and has been broadcast on several TV and radio stations, e. g. ARD, WDR, HR, Bayrische Rundfunk and SWR. His arrangements and compositions have been published by Tonos (Darmstadt) and KSG Edition (Köln).
