= Herring buss =

Type of seagoing fishing vessel

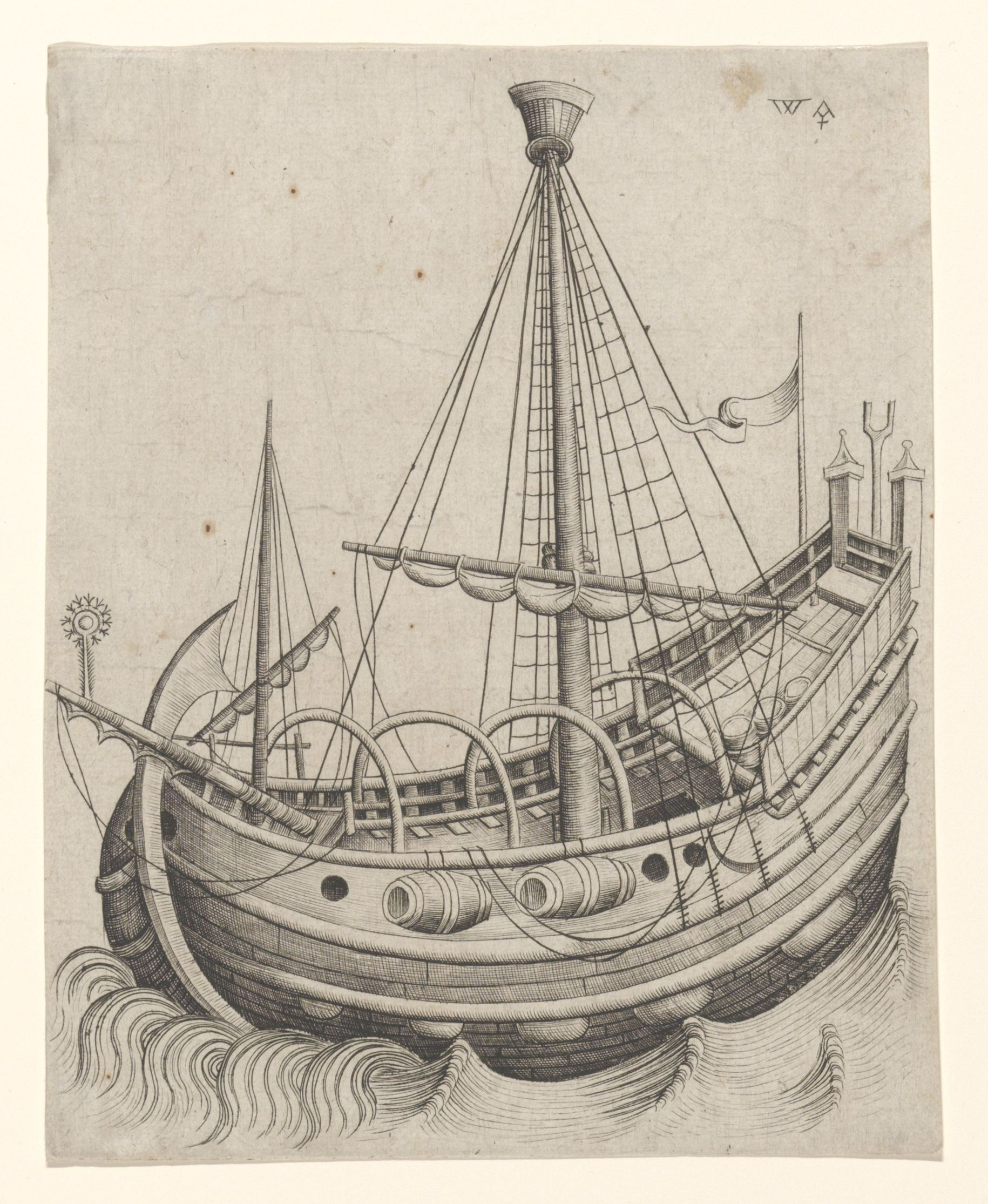
Oldest depiction of a herring buss, c. 1480

A herring buss (Dutch: Haringbuis) was a type of seagoing fishing vessel, mostly used by Dutch and Flemish herring fishermen in the 15th through early 19th centuries.

== History ==
The buss ship was already known around the time of the Crusades in the Mediterranean as a cargo vessel (called buzza, bucia or bucius). Development advanced in the 11th century with the Viking longship in Scandinavia, known as a bǘza. The Dutch buis was probably developed from this Scandinavian ship type.

The buis was first adapted for use as a fishing vessel in the Netherlands after the invention of gibbing made it possible to preserve herring at sea. This made longer voyages feasible and hence enabled Dutch fishermen to follow the herring shoals far from the coasts. The first herring buss was probably built in Hoorn around 1415. The last one was built in Vlaardingen in 1841.

== Construction ==
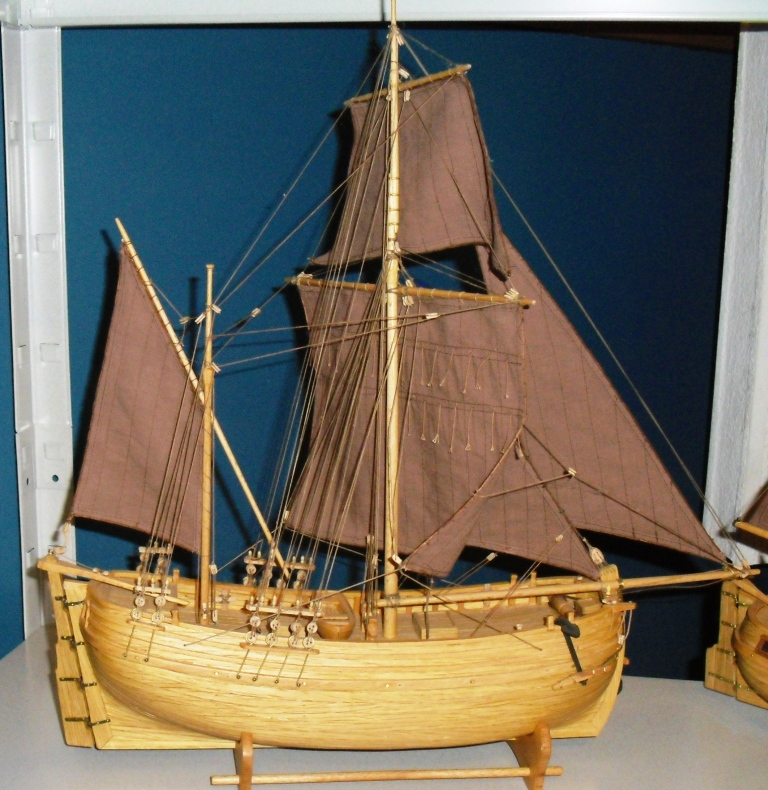
Model of a herring buss

The wooden ship was about 20 meters in length and displaced between 60 and 100 tons. The ratio of length to beam was between 2.5:1 and 4.5:1, which made for a relatively nimble ship, though still sufficiently stable to be seaworthy. It was a round-bilged keel ship with a round bow and stern, the latter relatively high, and with a gallery. The broad deck provided space to process the catch on board.

The ship had two or three masts. The mainmast and foremast (if present) could be lowered during fishing, leaving only the mizzen mast upright. It was square rigged on the main mast, with a gaff rig on the mizzen. It had a long bowsprit with jibboom and up to three headsails. The main course and topsail could be reefed.

== Fleets ==
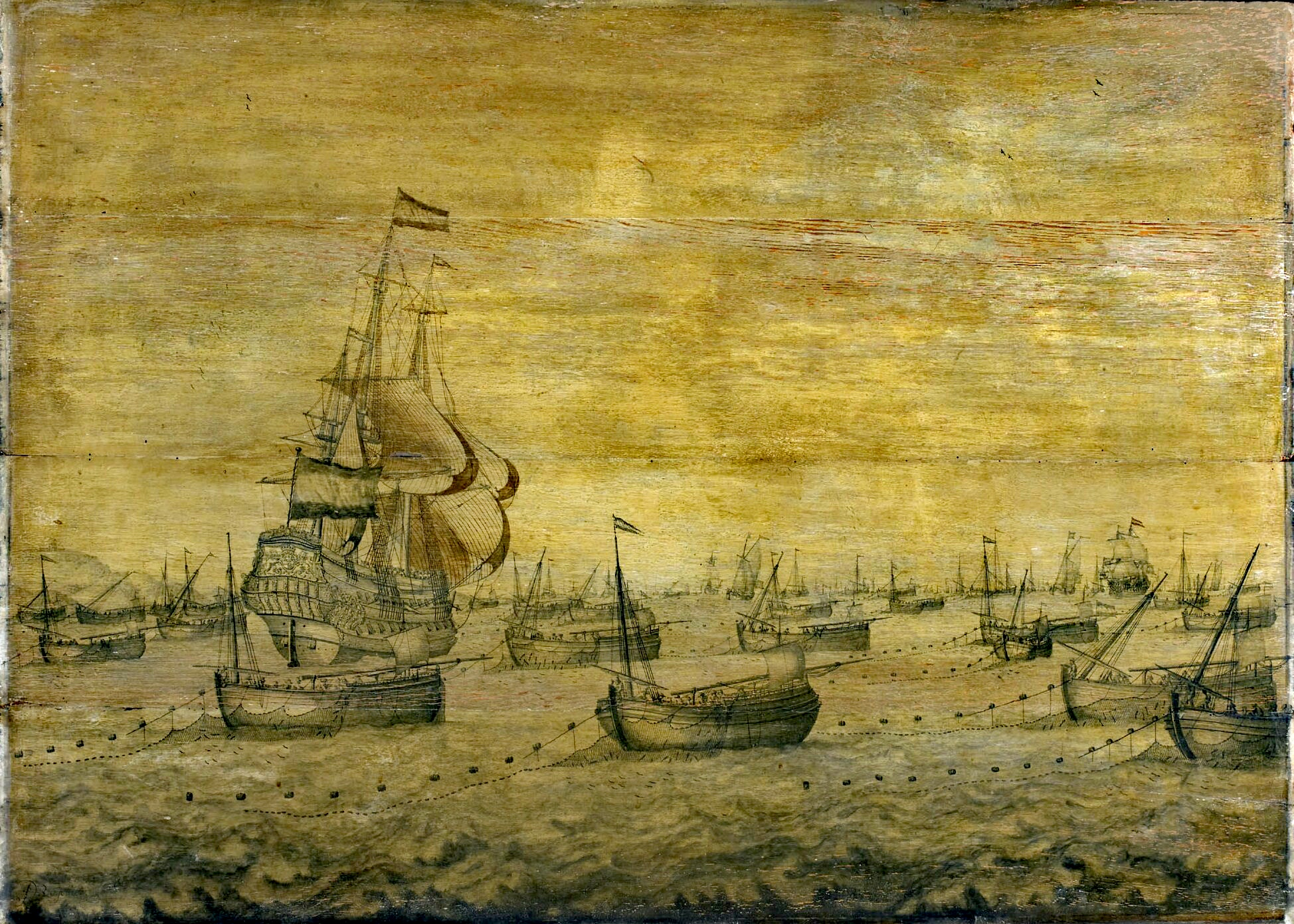
The Dutch herring fleet, c. 1700, escorted by a naval vessel

The ships sailed in large fleets of 400 to 500 ships to the fishing grounds at the Dogger Bank and the Shetland isles. They were usually escorted by naval vessels because the English looked askance at what they considered "poaching" in waters they claimed and were prone to arrest unescorted Dutch fishing vessels. In wartime the risk of fishing vessels being taken by privateers was also large.

The fleet would stay at sea for weeks at a time. The catch would sometimes be brought home by special ships (called ventjagers) while the fleet would still be at sea. The busses used long drift nets to catch herring. Such nets hang like curtains across the travel paths of herring schools. The fish would catch with their gills behind the meshes of the net (which is therefore a type of gillnet). The nets would be taken aboard at night and then the crews of 18 to 30 men would start the gibbing, salting and barrelling immediately.

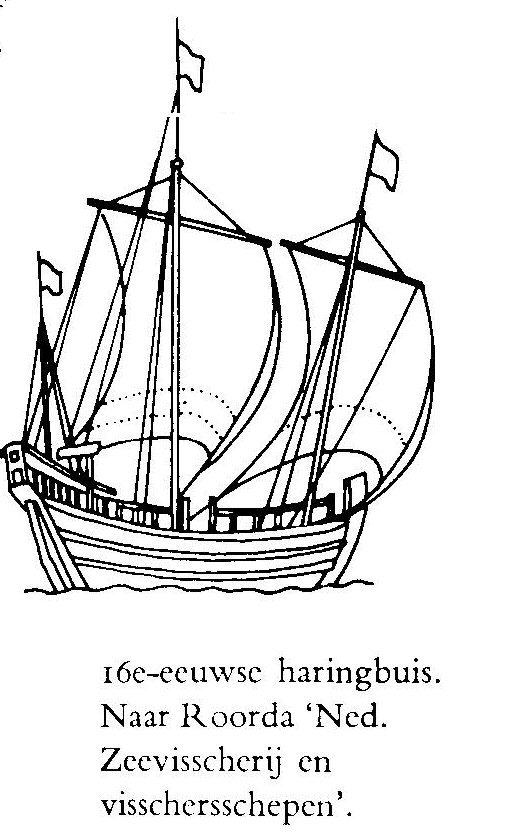
A buis of 16th century

There would be three to four voyages per season (depending on the weather and the catch). In the off-season the busses were used as normal cargo vessels, for instance to transport grain from the Baltic or salt from Portugal. This multi-mode business model made the Great Fishery (as the herring fishery was called) especially profitable, as there was far less downtime than with exclusive use as fishing vessel.

A 1614 account by writer Tobias Gentleman illustrates the efficiency and profitability of the business:

The Hollanders do make both a profitable and a pleasant trade of this Summer fishing. For there was one of them that having a gallant great new Buss of his own, and he having a daughter married unto one that was his Mate in the Buss: the Owner that was Master of this Buss did take his wife with him aboard, and his Mate with his wife; and so they did set sail for the North seas, with the two women with them, the mother and the daughter. Where, having a fair wind, and being fishing in the North seas, they had soon filled their Buss with herrings; and a Herring-Yager cometh unto them, and brings them gold and fresh supplies and copeth [bargaineth] with them, and taketh in their herrings for ready money, and delivereth them more barrels and salt; and away goeth the Yager for the first market into Sprucia [Prussia]. And still is the Buss fishing at sea, and soon after again was full laden and boone [bound] home: but then another Yager cometh unto him as did the former, and delivering them more provision of barrels, salt, and ready money, and bids them farewell. And still the Buss lieth at sea, with the mother and daughter, so long, and not very long before they had again all their barrels full; and then they sailed home into Holland, with the two women, and the Buss laden with herrings, and a thousand pounds of ready money

— Tobias Gentleman, "England's Way to Win Wealth and to employ Ships",

Atlantic herring

Gentleman estimates the cost of fitting out a Dutch herring buss for three voyages (four months) in summer (including wages for the crew at £88, barrels for 100 last (Note: A 'last' was usually a Dutch volume (displacement) measure. However, it could also be a weight measure for herring catches. In the latter case it was equivalent to about 1,000 kg at the time. This 'last' should not be confused with the last unit used by the Dutch East India Company, which was 1250 kg) of herring at £78, beer at £42, bread at £21, butter and bacon at £18, peas at £3, billet at £3, and wear and tear on ship and nets at £100) at £435. One hundred last of herring (at £10) would bring £1000 in his opinion, for a clear profit of £565. In his pamphlet (in which he holds up the Dutch fisheries for English emulation) he states that at the end of May a fleet of a thousand busses would sail, with 20,000 sailors aboard. They would sail to Shetland but wait till after 14 June (herring being unfit for consumption before that) before starting to follow the shoals. He estimates the value of the catch at more than a million pounds sterling. This illustrates how important the herring fisheries were in bringing about the Dutch Golden Age.

== Gallery ==
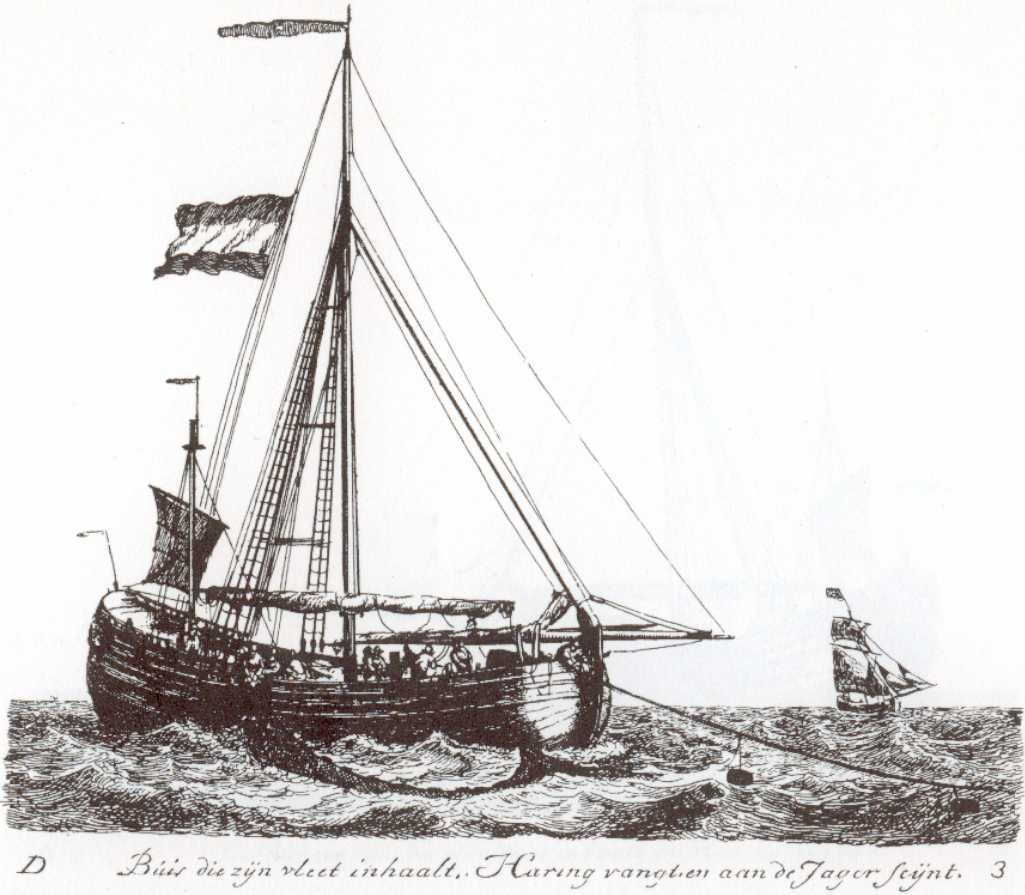
Herring buss taking aboard its drift net, by G. Groenewegen

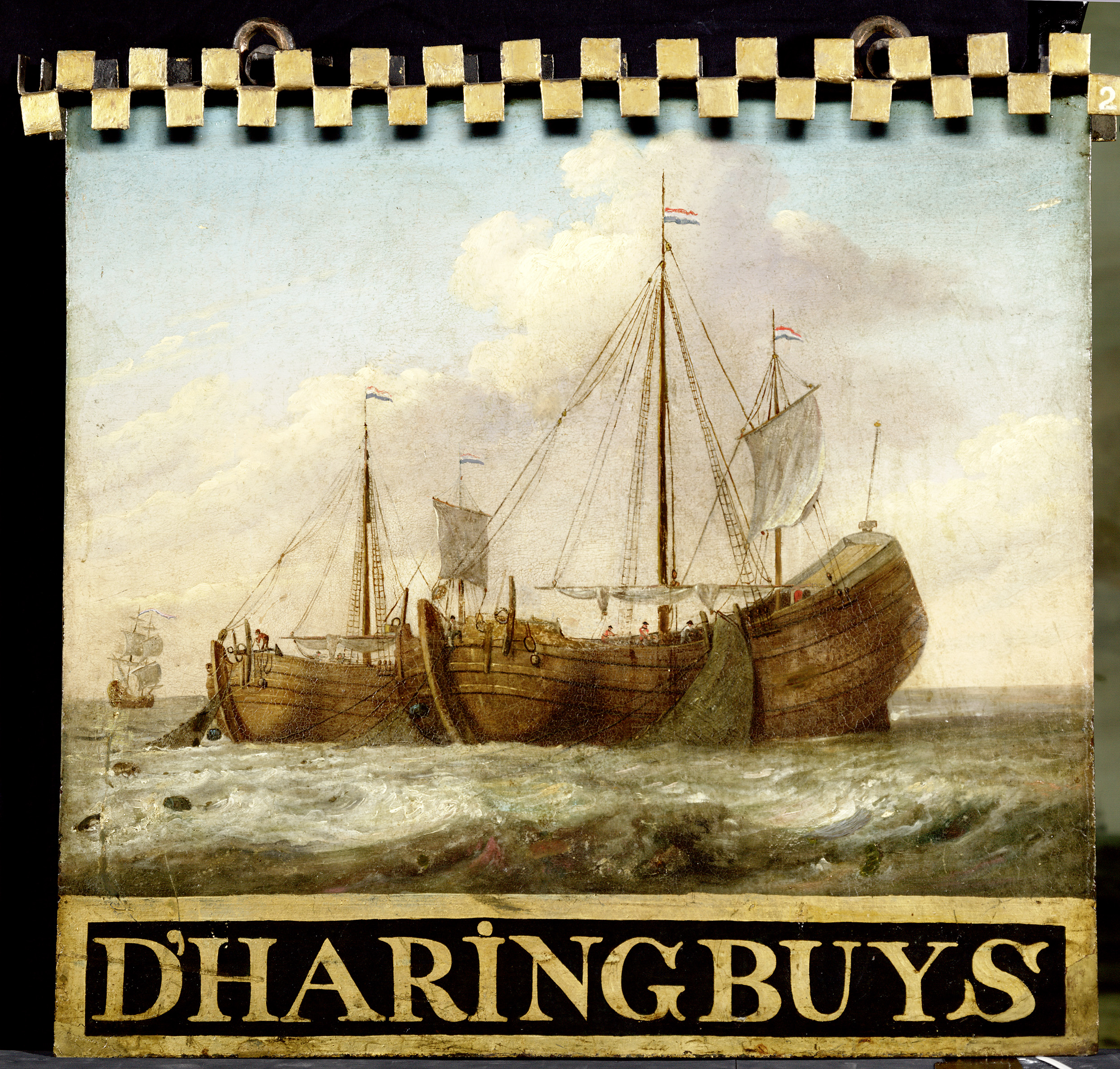
Two herring busses at sea

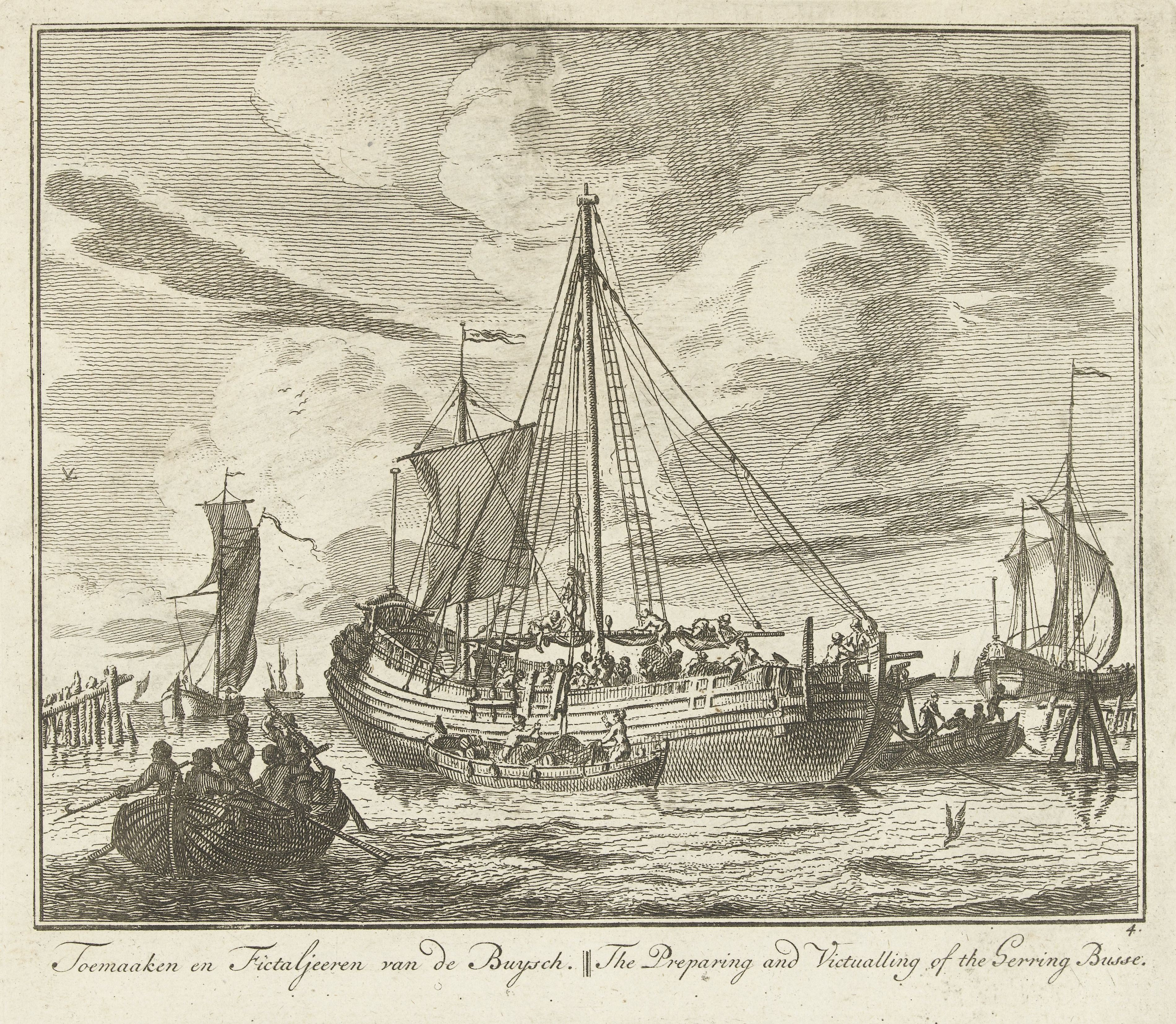
Equipping and supplying the herring buss, c. 1725

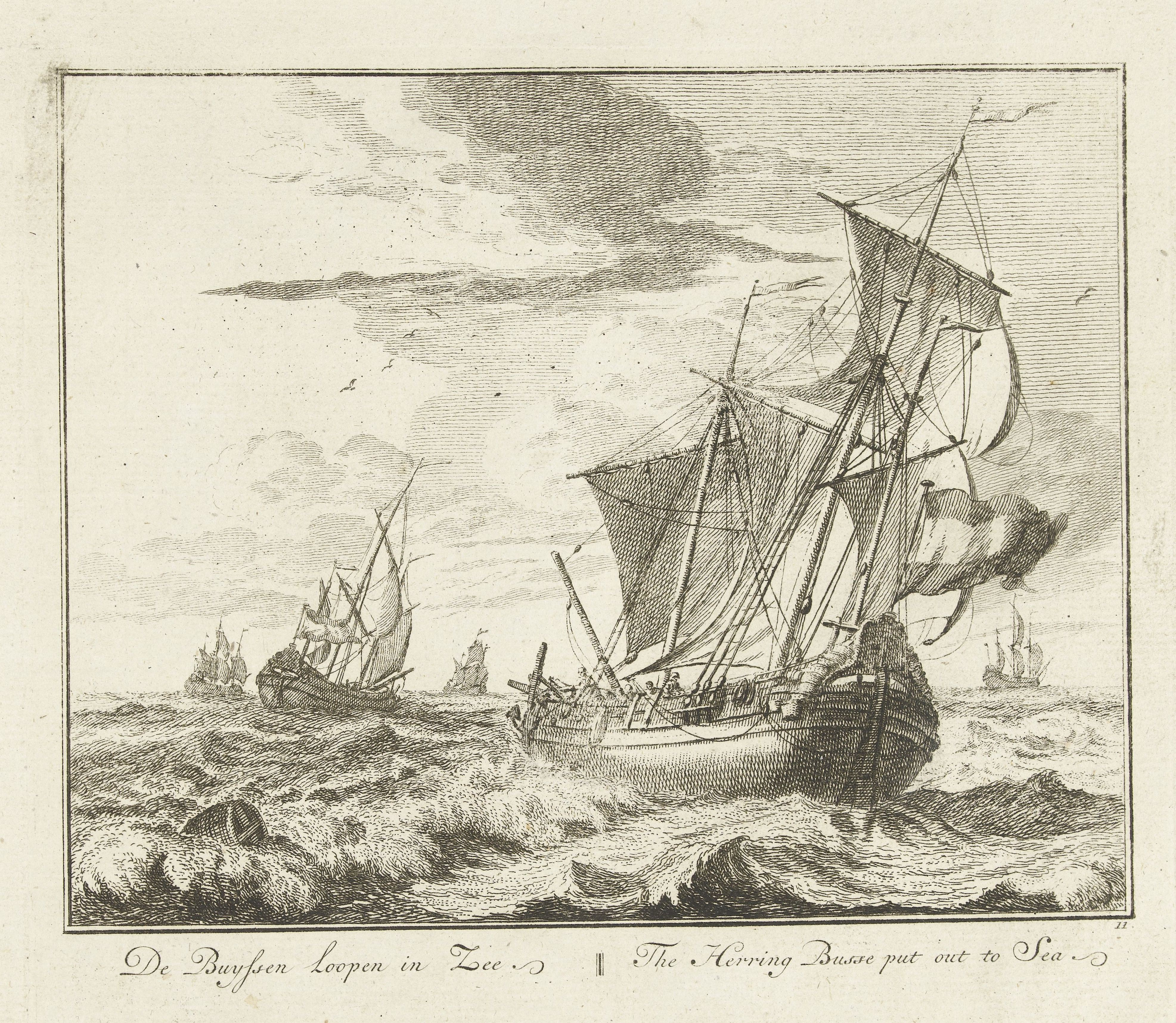
Herring busses at sea, c. 1725

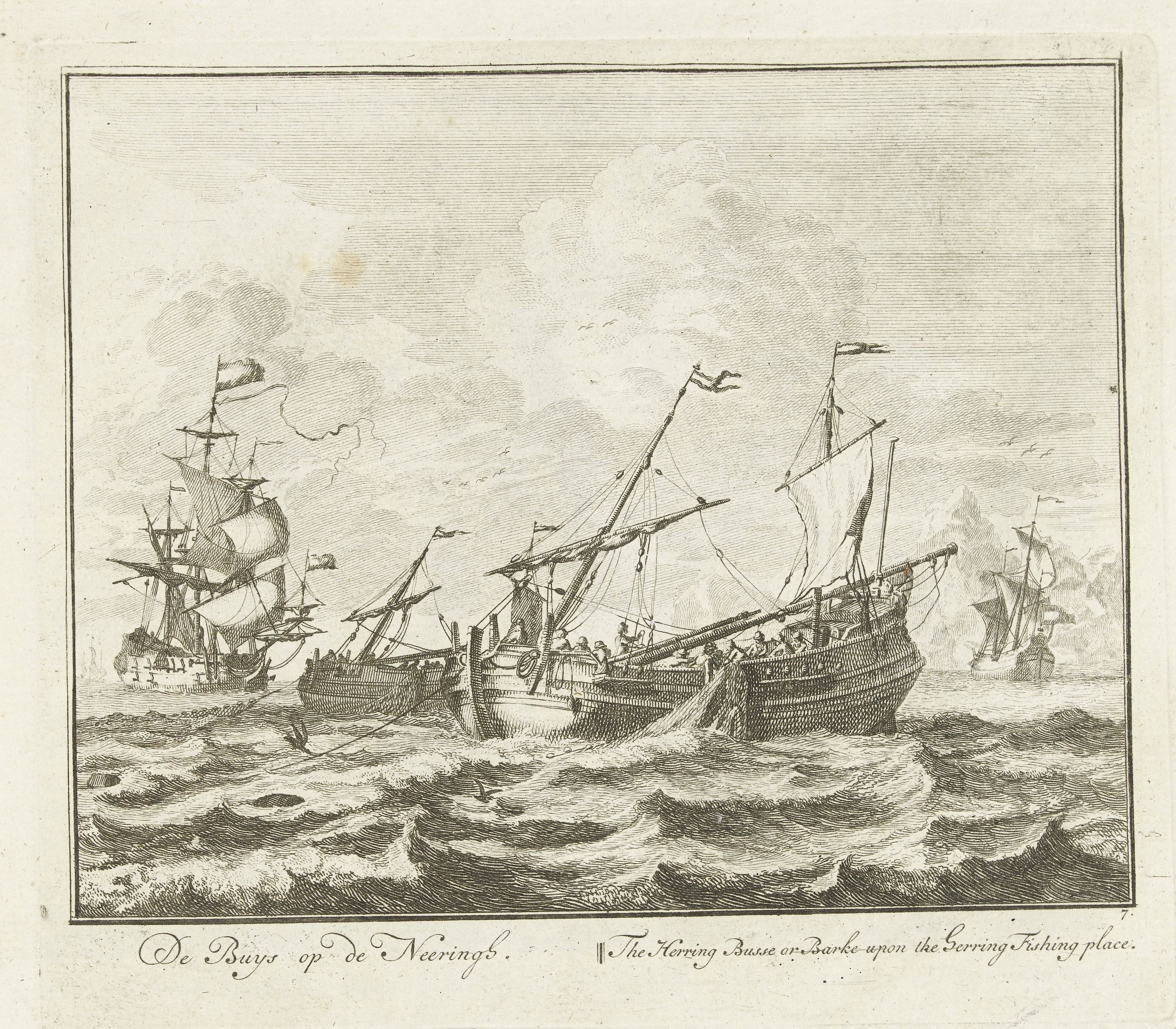
Herring busses hauling in the nets, c. 1725

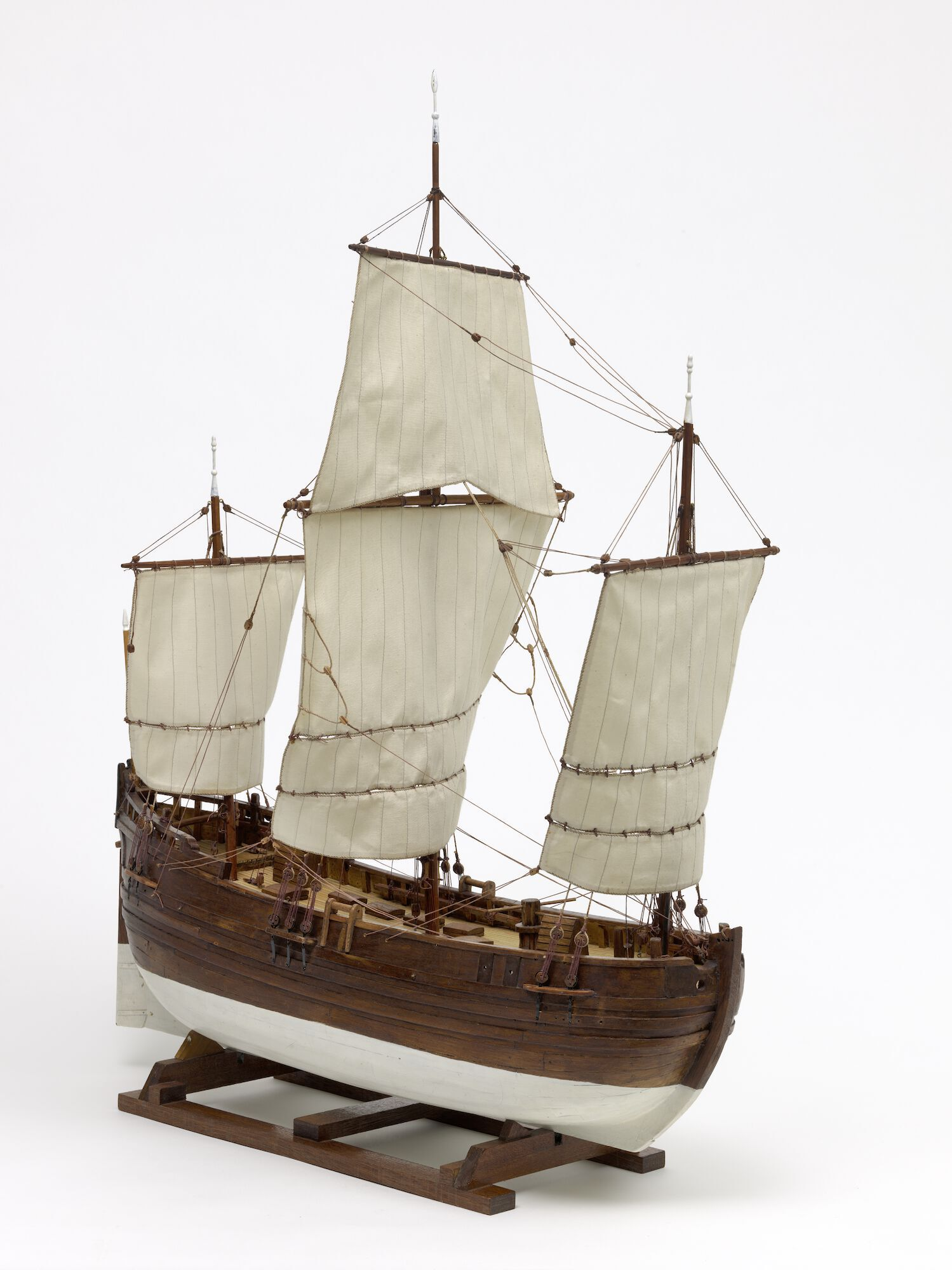
A model of herring buss, NAVIGO

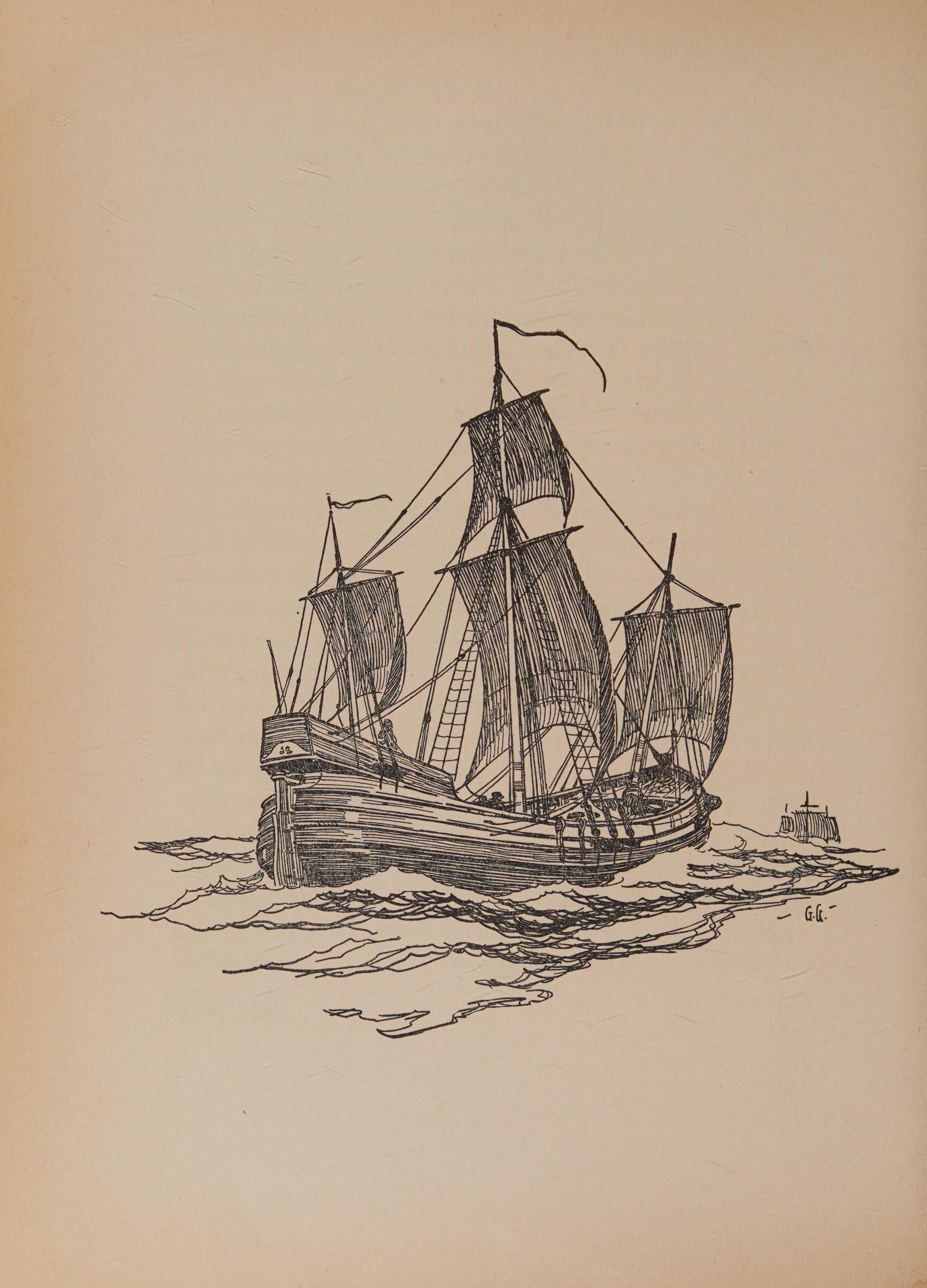
A herring buss; pen-and-ink plate by Gordon Grant, The Book of Old Ships (1924)

== See also ==
- Dogger (boat)

== Sources ==
- C. B., Hansen; Knuth, P. (1987). Lexikon der Segelschiffstypen (in German). Gräfelfing (Urbes). ISBN 3-924896-10-0.
- (German) "Büse", in: Dudszua, A. and Köpcke, A. (1995) Das große Buch der Schiffstypen. Schiffe, Boote, Flöße unter Riemen und Segel, Dampfschiffe, Motorschiffe, Meerestechnik, Augsburg
- Unger, R. W. (1978), Dutch Shipbuilding Before 1800, Amsterdam
- Michell, A.R., "The European Fisheries in Early Modern History", in: Rich, E.E. and Wilson, C.H. (Ed.) (1977), Cambridge Economic History of Europe, Vol. 5. The Economic Organization of Early Modern Europe, Cambridge
- {Vries, J. de, and Woude, A. van der (1997), The First Modern Economy. Success, Failure, and Perseverance of the Dutch Economy, 1500-1815, Cambridge University Press, ISBN 978-0-521-57825-7
- Gentlemen, Tobias (1614). England's Way to Win Wealth and to employ Ships. London. in: Arber, E.; Beazley, R.C.; Seccombe, T. (1903). Voyages and Travels Mainly During the 16th and 17th Centuries.
