= Tobias Gentleman =

Tobias Gentleman (fl. 1614) was an English mariner and writer, known for his book England's way to win wealth, recommending development of the herring fisheries in England.

== Life ==
Gentleman was a son of Thomas and Joan Gentleman, of Southwold, in Suffolk, England; Thomas Gentleman's father William was a merchant and shipowner.

He wrote that he was "borne a fisherman's sonne by the seashore," and spent his "youthful time about fisher affaires, whereby I am more skilfull in nets, lines, and hookes then in Rethoricke, Logicke, or learned bookes." About 1612 he was consulted by John Keymer, a writer on economics, who was collecting information about the herring fisheries with a view to stimulating their development. Gentleman gave Keymer the benefit of his experience, but, nothing having come of the scheme, Gentleman determined to publish his ideas himself.

The result appeared in 1614, published by Nathaniel Butter of London, under the title England's way to win wealth, and to employ ships and marriners, or, A plain description what great profite, it will bring unto the Commonwealth of England, by the erecting, building, and adventuring of busses, to sea, a-fishing. With a true relation of the inestimable wealth that is yearely taken out of his majesties seas, by the Hollanders, by their numbers of busses, pinkes and line-boates … and also a discourse of the sea-coast townes of England. It was dedicated to Henry Howard, 1st Earl of Northampton and warden of the Cinque Ports.

== Later history of the book ==
Nothing more is known of Gentleman. In 1660 a new edition of his book, with an address to the reader instead of the dedication, and other alterations, appeared as The Best Way to make England the richest and wealthiest country in Europe by Advancing the Fishing Trade. It was also included in The Harleian Miscellany (editions of 1744 and 1808).

Gentleman's scheme was similar to that propounded by the military writer Robert Hitchcock in his Politique Platt for a Prince (1581), and both Hitchcock and Gentleman are commended by Thomas Mun. Gerard de Malynes gives an abridgement of Gentleman's book in his Lex Mercatoria (1622) (chapter xlvii).
