= Tobia Nicotra =

Italian document forger

Tobia Nicotra was an Italian forger who produced counterfeit works of artists in various disciplines. In 1937, he was described as "the most proficient forger of autographs". He may have produced as many as 600 forgeries before he was caught.

== Career ==
During the 1920s, the works of Italian conductor Arturo Toscanini were popular in the United States and had "so important a role in the country's musical life" that during Nicotra's visit to the United States starting in the late 1920s, he capitalized on the popularity by writing a biography of the conductor. His 1929 manuscript was in Italian, but it was published only in English by Alfred A. Knopf with translation provided by Irma Brandeis and H. D. Kahn. It was rife with mistakes and has been described as "superficial" and containing "invented conversations". In 1932, he returned to the United States leading a salon orchestra impersonating Riccardo Drigo, an Italian composer who had died in 1930.

Nicotra produced forged manuscripts for various artists, including a poem by Torquato Tasso, the four-page musical manuscript Baci amorosi e cari attributed to Mozart, and works by Giovanni Battista Pergolesi. He attributed four of his forged manuscripts to Pergolesi, though his attempts to imitate the composer's handwriting were not entirely successful. Two of these were described by music historian Barry S. Brook as "awful" and written by a "totally unmusical" forger. He forged at least two manuscripts he ascribed to Handel: an aria he stated was from Handel's Italian period; and an air from the 1741 oratorio Messiah. Other musical forgeries he created were attributed to Gluck, Giovanni Pierluigi da Palestrina, and Richard Wagner.

His forgeries of composer autographs were described by Harry Haskell as "convincingly executed". He achieved this by visiting libraries in Milan housing historical manuscripts, and tearing out flyleaves (blank pages at the front or back of books) on which he would then add autographs. He wrote on the laid paper taken from those old manuscripts with a quill using iron-gall ink, which gave the forged documents an air of legitimacy. He went to an expert with his own forgery of a poem manuscript he attributed to Tasso, stating he thought it might be a forgery; he was told it was authentic.

He also created forgeries of letters and other documents purportedly written by famous historical figures, including Christopher Columbus, Leonardo da Vinci, Abraham Lincoln, the Marquis de Lafayette, Martin Luther, Michelangelo, and George Washington. Major institutions purchased some of his forgeries, including the Library of Congress which in 1928 bought several Mozart autographs for $60 (equivalent to $947 in 2021) that experts had "accepted as genuine".

With the income he earned from the sale of his forgeries, Nicotra rented seven apartments in Milan, each for a mistress.

Many of his forgeries were sold in the United States during his visits in the 1920s and early 1930s. Forged Pergolesi autographs were sold to the Library of Congress, the Metropolitan Opera Guild, and even to the library in Pergolesi's hometown of Pergola. Walter Toscanini, son of Arturo and an authority in antiquarian manuscripts, bought a Mozart manuscript from Nicotra for 2,700 lire. Upon inspection, he suspected it to be a forgery and sent it to Mozarteum University Salzburg, where an historian verified it as authentic. Toscanini later determined it was a forgery, and with Milanese detective Giorgio Florita was able to catch Nicotra selling forgeries to Milanese publishing house Hoepli. Nicotra was eventually arrested for failing to provide an identity document upon request; a search yielded a forged identity document with his photograph and Drigo's name.

On 9 November 1934 he was sentenced to two years in prison and fined 2,400 lire (3088 Euro in 2022), based on testimony by Walter Toscanini and librarians from Milan whose testimony described the ruined manuscripts in their libraries. Police who had arrested him testified that at the time of his arrest he had autograph forgeries in progress at his workshop, including ones for Christopher Columbus, Warren G. Harding, Tadeusz Kościuszko, Leonardo da Vinci, Abraham Lincoln, the Marquis de Lafayette, Martin Luther, Michelangelo, and George Washington. Nicotra was paroled early by the National Fascist Party that ruled the Kingdom of Italy, in order to have him forge signatures for them.

In August 2022, a Galileo Galilei manuscript at the University of Michigan Library that had been described as "one of the great treasures" held in its collection was identified as a Nicotra forgery.

== Verified forgeries ==
Nine forgeries have been identified as his work, and the locations of the remainder are unknown.

- Baci amorosi e cari attributed to Mozart, at Library of Congress
- Attributed to Pergolesi:
  - Agnus Dei, at Metropolitan Opera
  - Miserere nobis
  - Non mi negar signora, at Library of Congress
  - O salutaris hostia
- Galileo manuscript, at University of Michigan Library
