= Rietveld joint =

Type of joint in furniture-making

Schematic depiction of a Rietveld joint. The three battens are shown in the primary colours red, blue and yellow, where the yellow batten is oriented orthogonal to the screen. The locations of the dowels are shown in gray; the dowel connecting the yellow batten to the blue batten is the third and final one.

A Rietveld joint, also called a Cartesian node in furniture-making, is an overlapping joint of three battens in the three orthogonal directions.

== Description ==
A Rietveld joint is an overlapping joint of three battens in the three orthogonal directions. It was a prominent feature in the Red and Blue Chair that was designed by Gerrit Rietveld. In Gerrit Rietveld's furniture, many of these joints were doweled, meaning that the adjoining faces were connected with glued wooden pins. The first two connections were made by boring a hole about 1 mm deeper than the dowel length, but the third connection was made with a longer dowel, boring through a batten, leaving a circular mark that had to be painted over.

== History ==
Rietveld joints are inextricably linked with the early 20th century Dutch artistic movement called De Stijl (of which Gerrit Rietveld was a member), a movement whose aims included ultimate simplicity and abstraction. This led to the movement's three-dimensional works having vertical and horizontal lines that are positioned in layers or planes that do not intersect, thereby allowing each element to exist independently and unobstructed by other elements and giving a piece a visually raw and simplified look.
