= Zig-Zag Chair =

Chair designed by Gerrit Rietveld

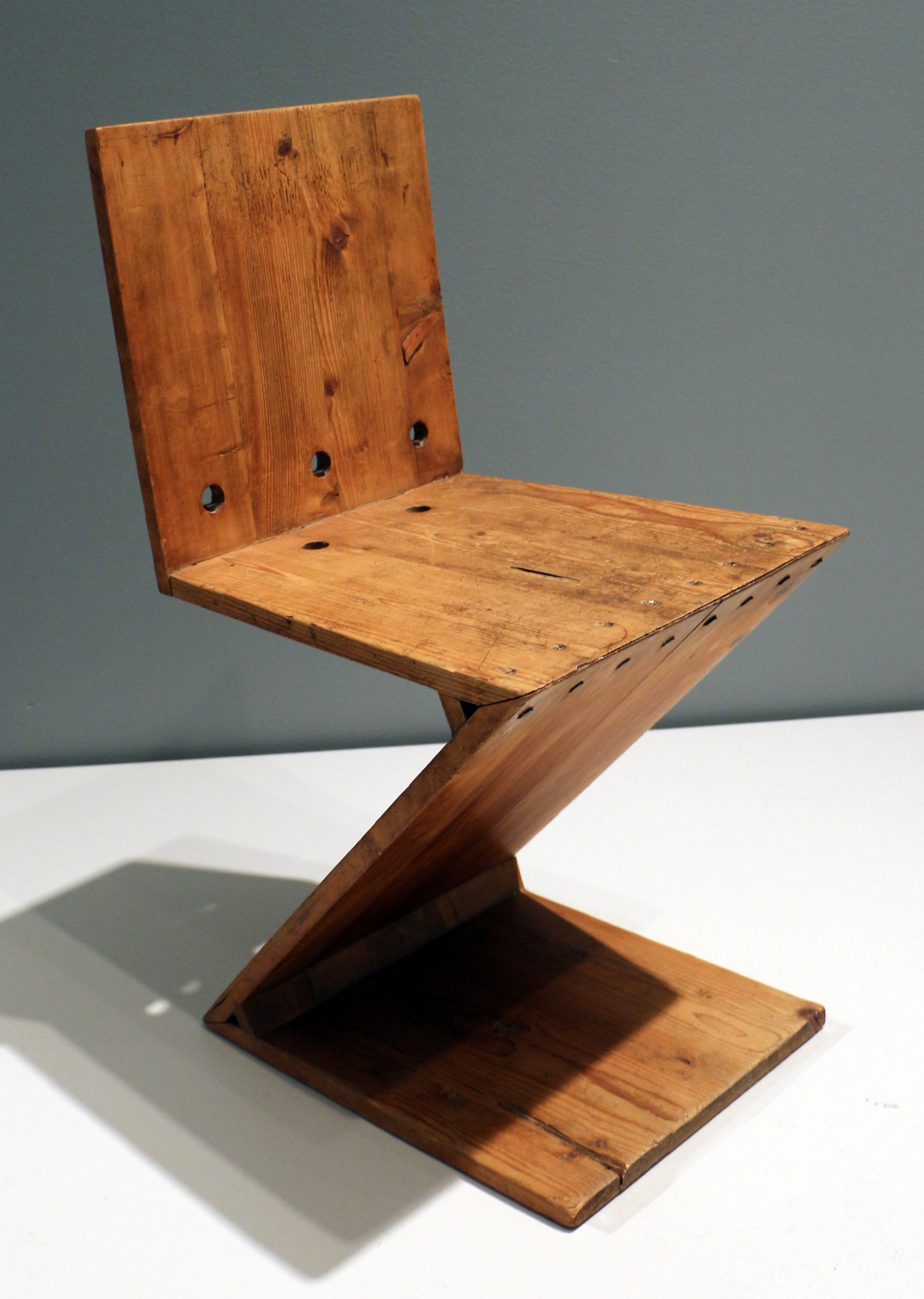
Zig Zag Chair in the Carnegie Museum of Art

The Zig Zag-chair is a chair designed by Gerrit Rietveld sometime between 1932 and 1934.

It is a minimalistic design without legs, made by four flat wooden slabs (originally in Elm, now in pine wood) that are merged in a Z-shape using dovetailed and bolted or screwed joints. It was designed for Rietveld's Rietveld Schröder House in Utrecht and is now produced under license in Cherry or Ash by the Italian manufacturer Cassina S.p.A., and others as unlicensed knock-offs.

The Italian brand has tapped One Block Down for a new collaboration, featuring a limited-edition run of 30 pieces where the wooden chair is covered in metal.

== See also ==
- Red and Blue Chair

== Sources ==
- "About the Zig Zag-chair".
- "About the Zig Zag-chair".
