= Han Schröder =

Dutch architect and educator (1918–1992)

- Born: July 16, 1918; Utrecht, Netherlands
- Died: March 20, 1992 (aged 73); Amsterdam, Netherlands
- Education: ETH Zurich, 1940
- Occupation: Architect
- Buildings: Gaastra House, Kessler House

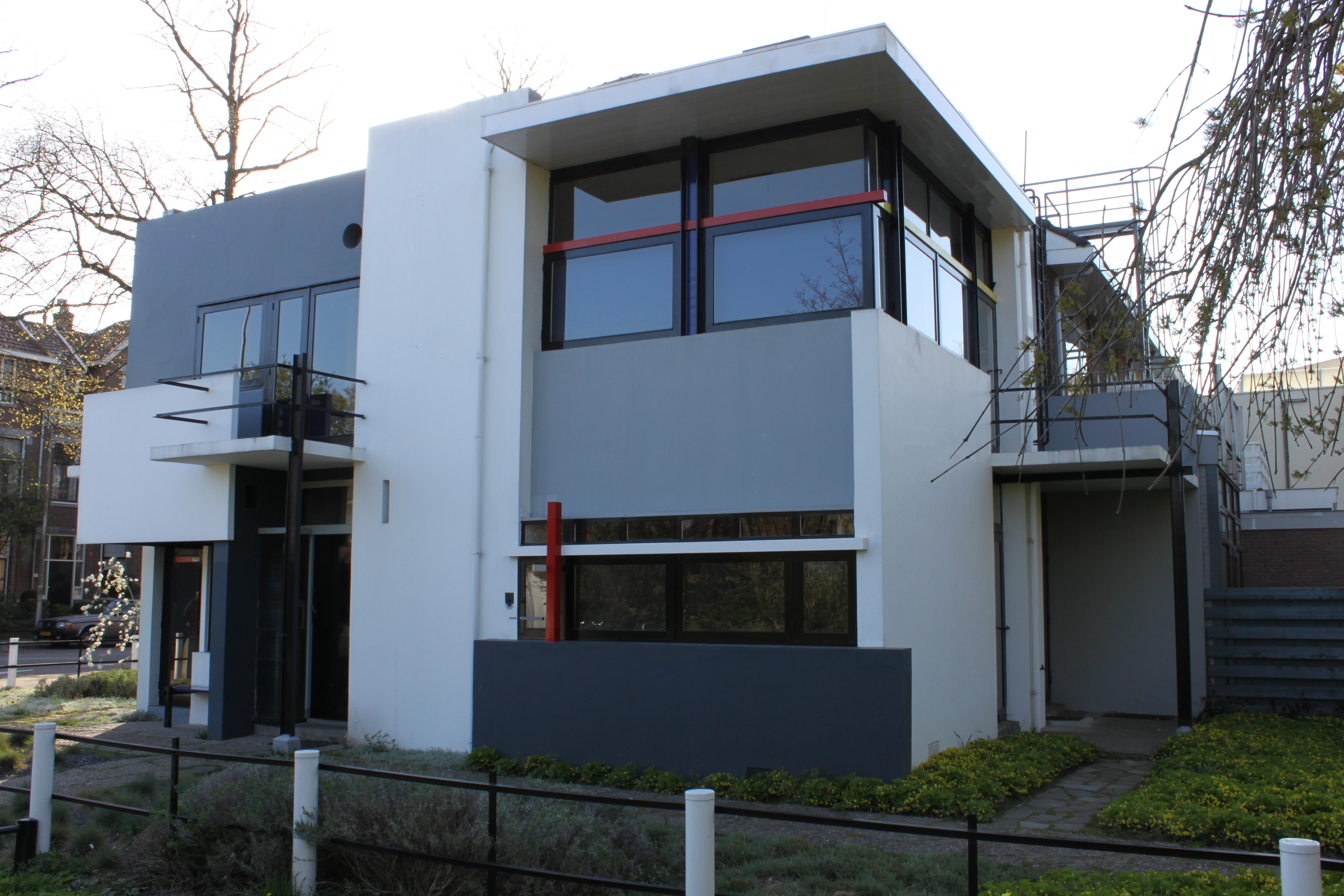
The Schröder House in Utrecht where Han Schröder lived as a child and later helped to restore as supervising architect

Johanna Erna Else Schröder (16 July 1918 – 20 March 1992) was a Dutch architect and educator. After becoming one of the first women to practice architecture in the Netherlands, she opened her own architecture and interior design firm in Amsterdam. In the 1963, she immigrated to the United States where she went on to teach interior design at Adelphi University, Parsons School of Design, New York Institute of Technology and Virginia Commonwealth University.

== Early life and education ==
Schröder lived in the Schröder House in Utrecht, the Netherlands, together with her mother, Truus Schröder-Schräder, who was also an interior decorator. The house with moving partitions was designed in 1924 by Gerrit Thomas Rietveld who became a friend of Schröder's and an important influence on her future works. In a personal interview with the International Archive of Women in Architecture, Schröder described the moving partitions are meant to be "the medium for dynamic flexibility", as a house is not supposed to be "a series of cubicles."

While a teenager, she worked on furniture design with both Rietveld and with Gerard van de Groenekan. In 1936, she attended the Federal Institute of Technology in Zurich, Switzerland, graduating as an architect in 1940.

== Career ==
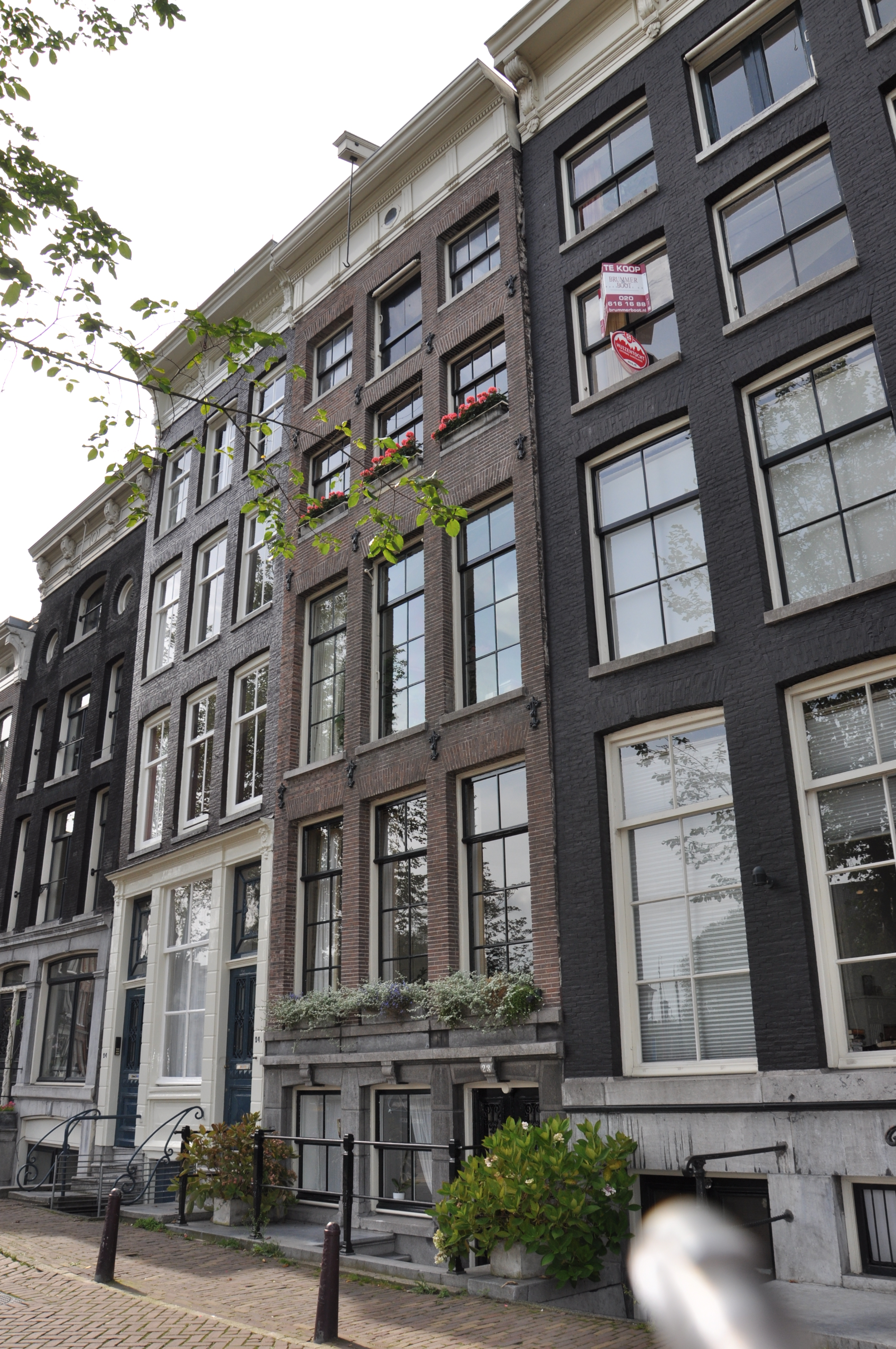
Kromme Waal 23 and 24, Amsterdam where Han lived with her sister Marianne and Cora de Castro, a friend

Schröder spent the years of the Second World War in Portugal working for the Red Cross and in the United Kingdom. In 1946, she returned to the Netherlands where she worked at Amsterdam's Modern Art Museum until 1949. Thereafter she joined Rietveld's architecture firm where she worked on housing projects, schools, exhibitions, and the Sonsbeek Sculpture Pavilion.

In 1954, Schröder opened her own office in Amsterdam. She was one of just two registered women architects in the Netherlands compared to around 3,000 men registered at the time. Key designs included the Gaastra House in Zeist, a centre for rejected children in Ellecom, an auditorium for the Social Work Academy, and Kessler House, a recreation building for employees working in the steel industry. In 1962, Schröder designed a low-cost subsidized housing complex that maximized the use of small spaces using moving partitions for retired, single nurses in Austerlitz, a village in the Netherlands. This project received much attention from the general public and was inaugurated by Queen Juliana.

After emigrating to the United States in 1963, Schröder worked at a couple architecture firms in California before being hired to teach in New York. She taught interior design at Adelphi University and the Parsons School of Design before being appointed professor at the New York Institute of Technology. From 1972 to 1987, Schröder was the architect responsible for the restoration of Schröder House in Utrecht which is now a museum. Two of her designs are in the collection of the New York Museum of Modern Art. From 1981 she taught at the Virginia Commonwealth University in Richmond, Virginia until her retirement as professor emerita in 1988. After her retirement, Schröder moved back to the Netherlands.

Schröder died in March 1992 at the Boerhaave Clinic in Amsterdam.

== Sources ==
- http://spec.lib.vt.edu/iawaspec/schroder/schroder.htm
- Business card Passeerdersgracht
- Business card Kromme Waal
