= Truus Schröder-Schräder =

Dutch architect (1889–1985)

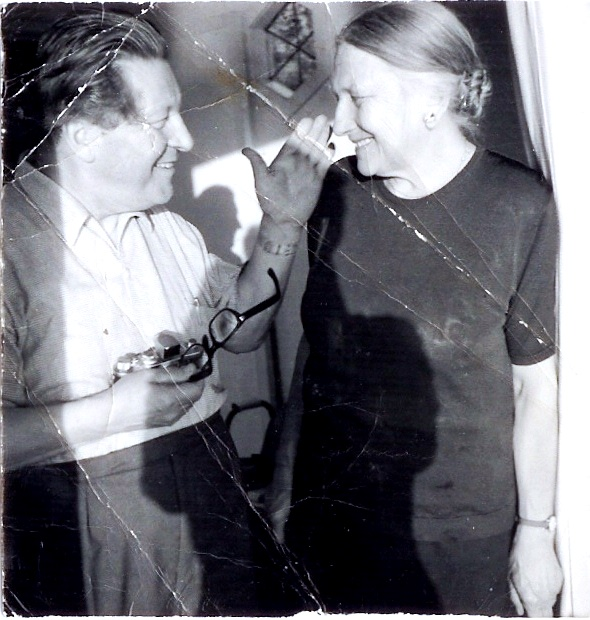
- Truus Schröder with Gerrit Rietveld
- Born: Deventer, Netherlands
- Occupation: Architect

Truus Schröder-Schräder (1889–1985) was a Dutch socialite and trained pharmacist who was closely involved with avant-garde artists and architects of the De Stijl movement. Together with Gerrit Rietveld, she built a house for herself and her three children – the Rietveld Schröder House – which is today a UNESCO World Heritage Site. Initially credited as a joint designer, this was often forgotten later once Rietveld became a well-known architect. Immediately following their collaboration on the house, she went on to work with Rietveld on multiple other architectural projects as well.

== Biography ==
Truus Schräder was born in Deventer, in the eastern part of the Netherlands, in 1889. Her father owned a textile factory, and her mother died when Truus was four. Her father remarried two years later, and the young girl did not get along with her stepmother. Truus was sent to a convent boarding school in Amersfoort. After that, she trained as a pharmacist. In 1911, she married Frits Schröder, a lawyer who was eleven years her senior but from a similar prosperous Catholic background. They had three children: a boy and two girls. The family lived in a spacious apartment in Utrecht, on the first floor of a large building in the Biltstraat, where Mr. Schröder had his offices.

The marriage became conflicted over ideas about social status, independence, and the upbringing of children. But her husband was amenable to her desire to create a room of her own, reflecting her own tastes, within the conventional Dutch bourgeois home that had originally belonged to him. So, with that one room, her partnership with architect Gerrit Rietveld began. Though Rietveld's design for the space struck her friends as plain and beneath Truus's social status, she was very content with it.

== Rietveld Schröder House ==
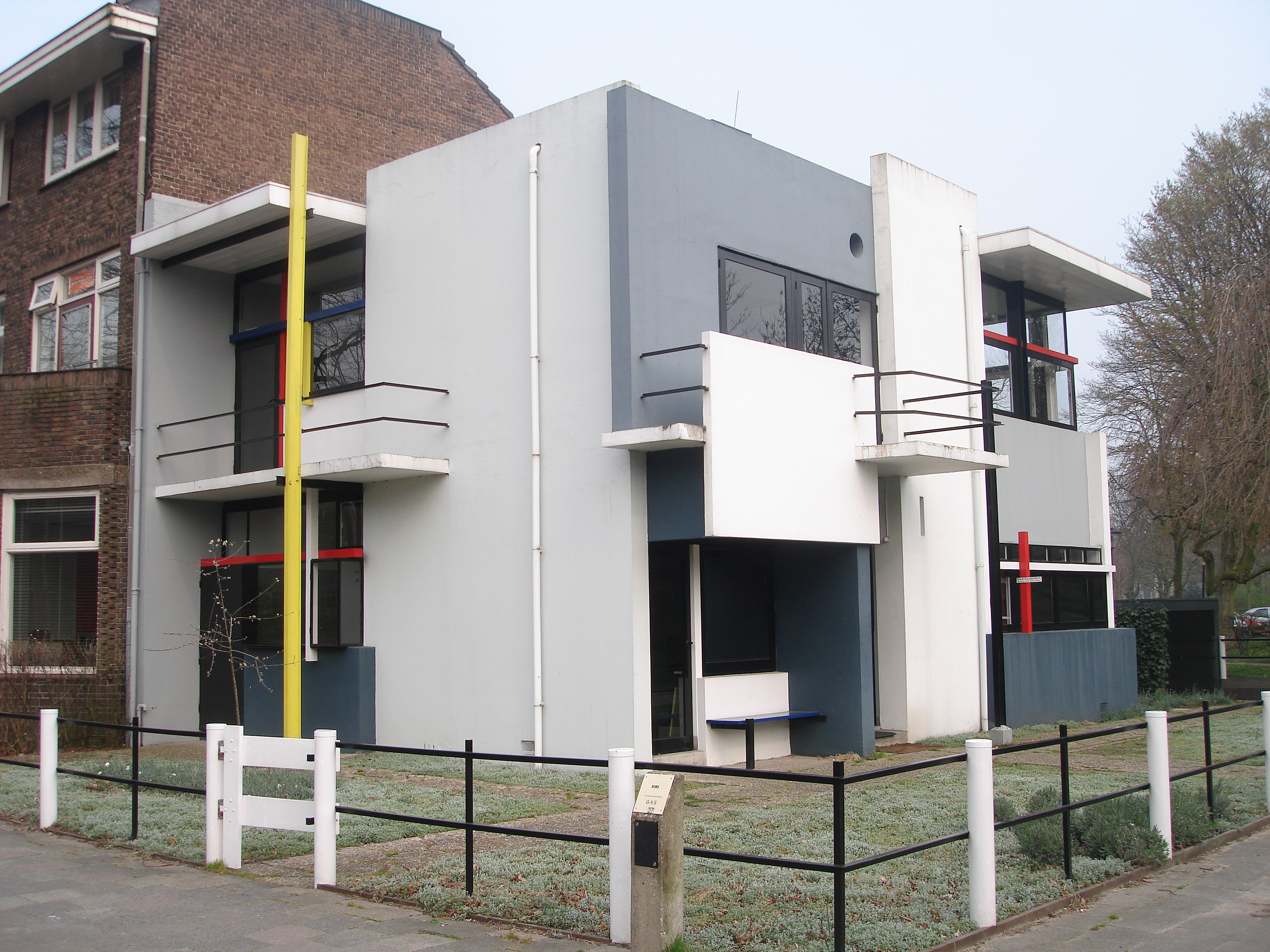
The Rietveld Schröder House in Utrecht, Netherlands

Rietveld Schröder House, Interior

In 1923, while Truus was in her mid 30s, she became a widow and was left to raise her children on her own. She decided she wanted to move out of the house in Biltstraat, where she had lived with her husband. For her next home, she had very definite ideas.

Truus had always been interested in the arts and, in 1923, commissioned Rietveld to design what later became known as the Rietveld Schröder House. While Truus had no experience or training as an architect or designer, she had a clear vision regarding her lifestyle and the aesthetics of her surroundings She collaborated with Rietveld on much of the built-in furniture and other fittings for the house. Though she was initially credited as joint designer for this project, that fact was forgotten once he became well known as an architect. This partnership not only proved how well they worked together: Truus and Gerrit also became lovers. They lived together in the Rietveld Schröder House until the end of his life.

For her, the house was a declaration of how an independent, modern woman could choose to live her life. A strong-willed person with daring ideas, Truus delighted in provoking her more conventional contemporaries. She was very content with her life at the Rietveld Schröder House, where she remained for more than 60 years. In 1982, Lenneke Buller and Frank Den Oudsten recorded a two-day interview, providing her an opportunity to talk about her life with Rietveld in this important house. She also explained how modernist design had first entered her life: "I hardly met any people who had a feeling for what was modern," she said. "It was through my sister that ideas came from the outside" Truus was later intimately involved in the restoration of the Rietveld Schröder House, for which she chose architect Bertus Mulder, who had worked with Rietveld. She had clear ideas on what should be done with her house, which she loved and described with the phrase, "the luxury of frugality". She lived there until her death, in 1985, at the age of 95.

Truus' daughter, Han Schröder, became a notable architect and educator. She was one of the first registered female architects in the Netherlands and taught interior decor in the United States.

== Other works ==
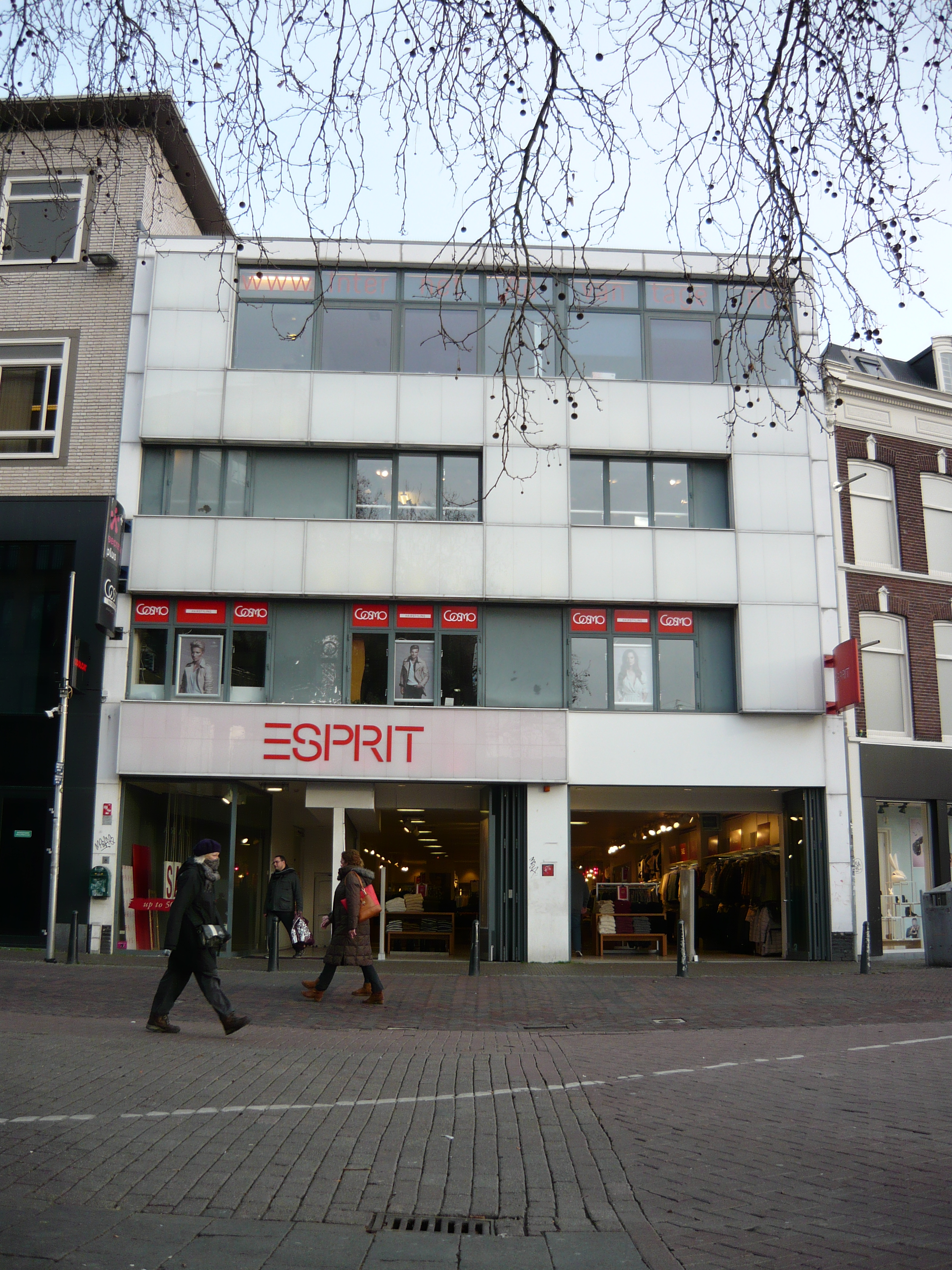
Cinema Vreeburg, Utrecht

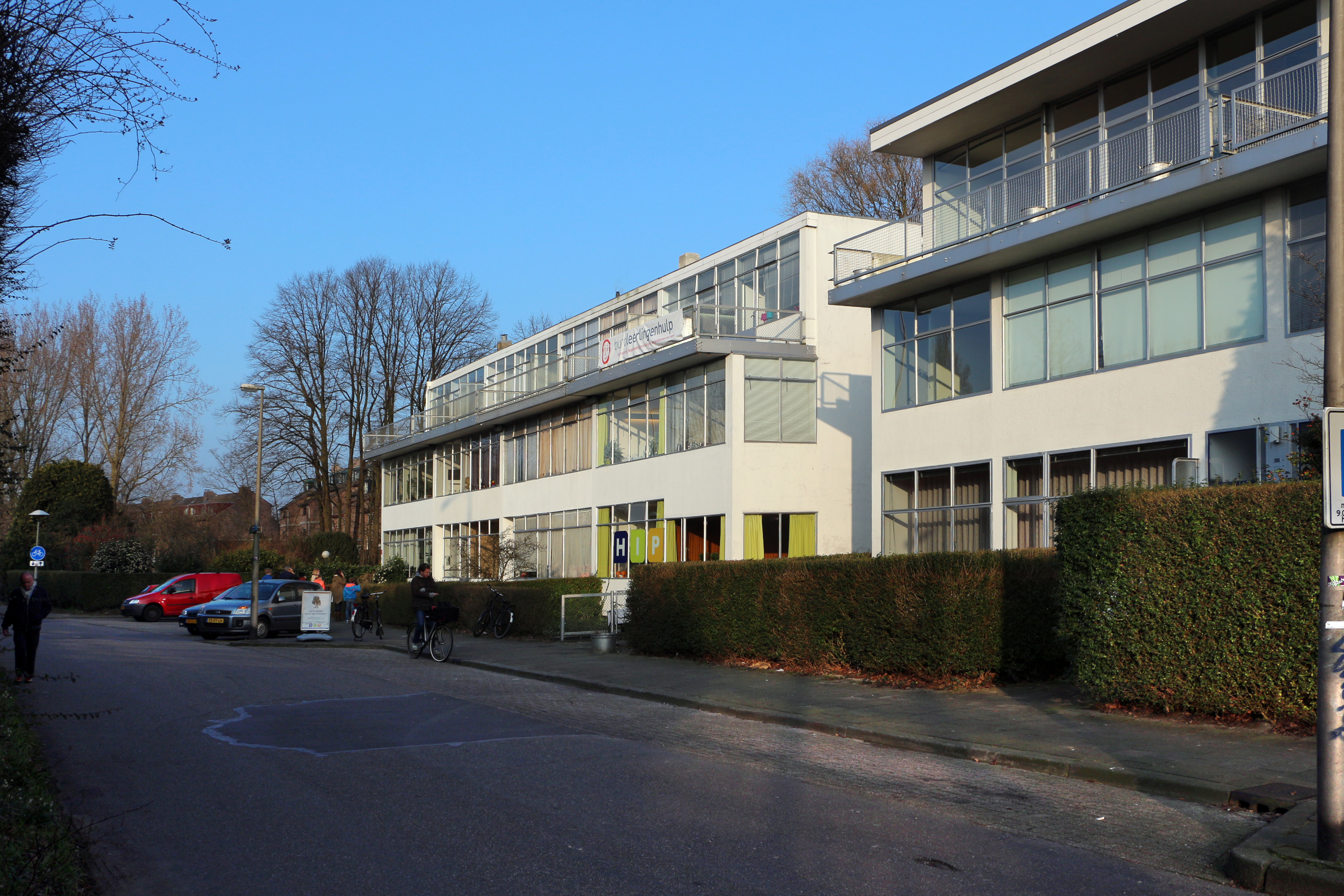
Houses on Erasmuslaan, Utrecht

Schröder-Schräder collaborated with Gerrit Rietveld on the following projects:

- Rietveld-Schroder House (1924)
- Glass Radio Cabinet (1925)
- Hanging Glass Cabinet (1926)
- Project for Standardized Housing and the interiors for the Birza House (1927)
- Van Urk House and the Desk (1930–31)
- Houses on Erasmuslaan (1934)
- Vreeburg Cinema and Movable Summer Houses (1936)
- Ekano interiors in Haarlem (1938)
