= Wim Rietveld =

Dutch designer (1924–1985)

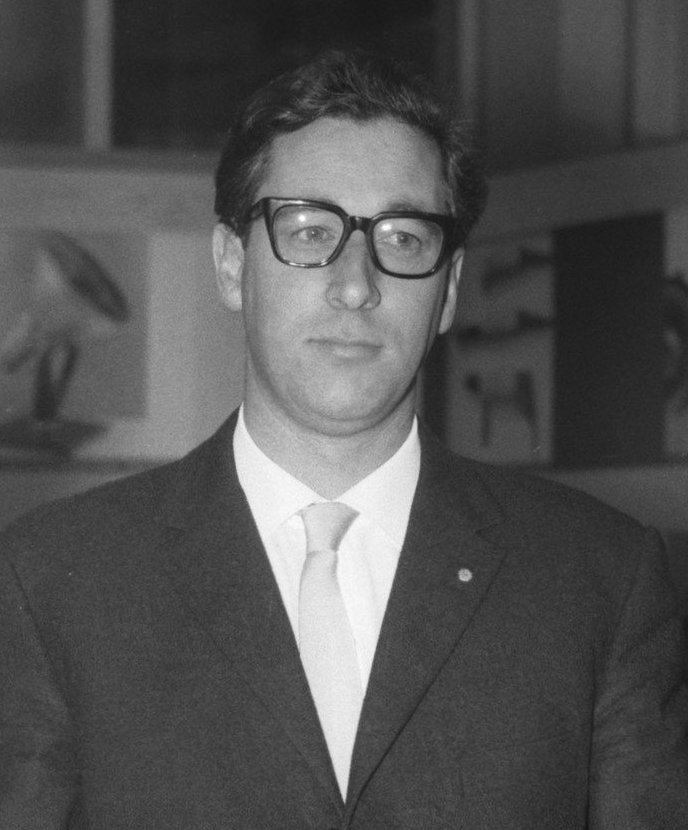
- Rietveld in 1961
- Born: 1924; Utrecht, Netherlands
- Died: 1985 (aged 60–61); Badhoevedorp, Netherlands
- Occupations: Furniture designer Industrial designer

Wim Rietveld (1924–1985) was a Dutch industrial and furniture designer. His father was the architect and designer Gerrit Rietveld.

== Education ==
Wim Rietveld received a technical education and began his career as a constructor of large equipment; among others, he was employed at Servo Balans, a company specialized in industrial weighing equipment. In 1950 he enrolled as one of the first students of a newly established course in industrial design at the Royal Academy of Art in The Hague.

== Design career ==
Because of the high quality of his graduation project, Rietveld was invited by W. H. Gispen to start working for his Gispen furniture company. At that moment, postwar reconstruction was in full force in the Netherlands, and materials were scarce.

Wim Rietveld was employed at Gispen from 1953 till 1957. He was talented in combining functionality and aesthetics in his furniture, and was able to devise simple production techniques. He was a typically Dutch designer in his love for construction and functionality. Unlike other typical Gispen furniture, Rietveld's designs did not use hollow tubular steel, but much thinner massive steel, which looks less conspicuous and is easier (and cheaper) to bend. Wim Rietveld also introduced foam rubber padding and pressed plywood at the Gispen company.

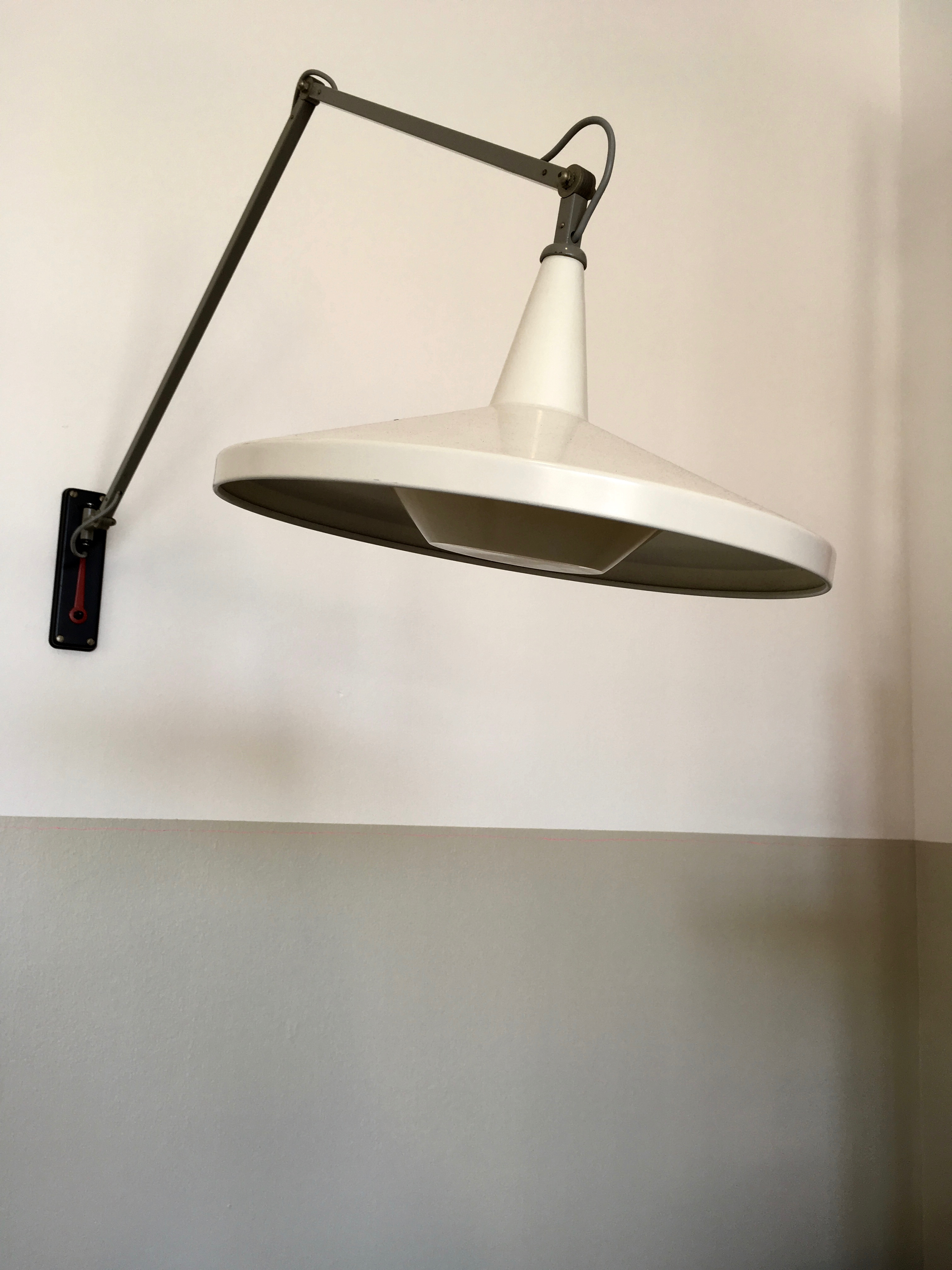
Panama lamp, produced by Gispen, 1953

Rietveld worked on several well-known Gispen furniture pieces, including the President office chair, and several light fixtures. He enjoyed a lot of artistic freedom at Gispen. His most well-known design is probably the Mondial chair, which he devised together with his father, Gerrit Rietveld. The stackable and linkable, delicate K-shaped chair was specifically created for Expo 58 in Brussels. It was intended to be fully executed in aluminum, but apart from a few prototypes this was not followed through at that time, as that was not yet technically possible. Gispen produced the chair's seat in polyester, against Rietveld's wishes. Shortly afterwards, Rietveld quit his position at Gispen.

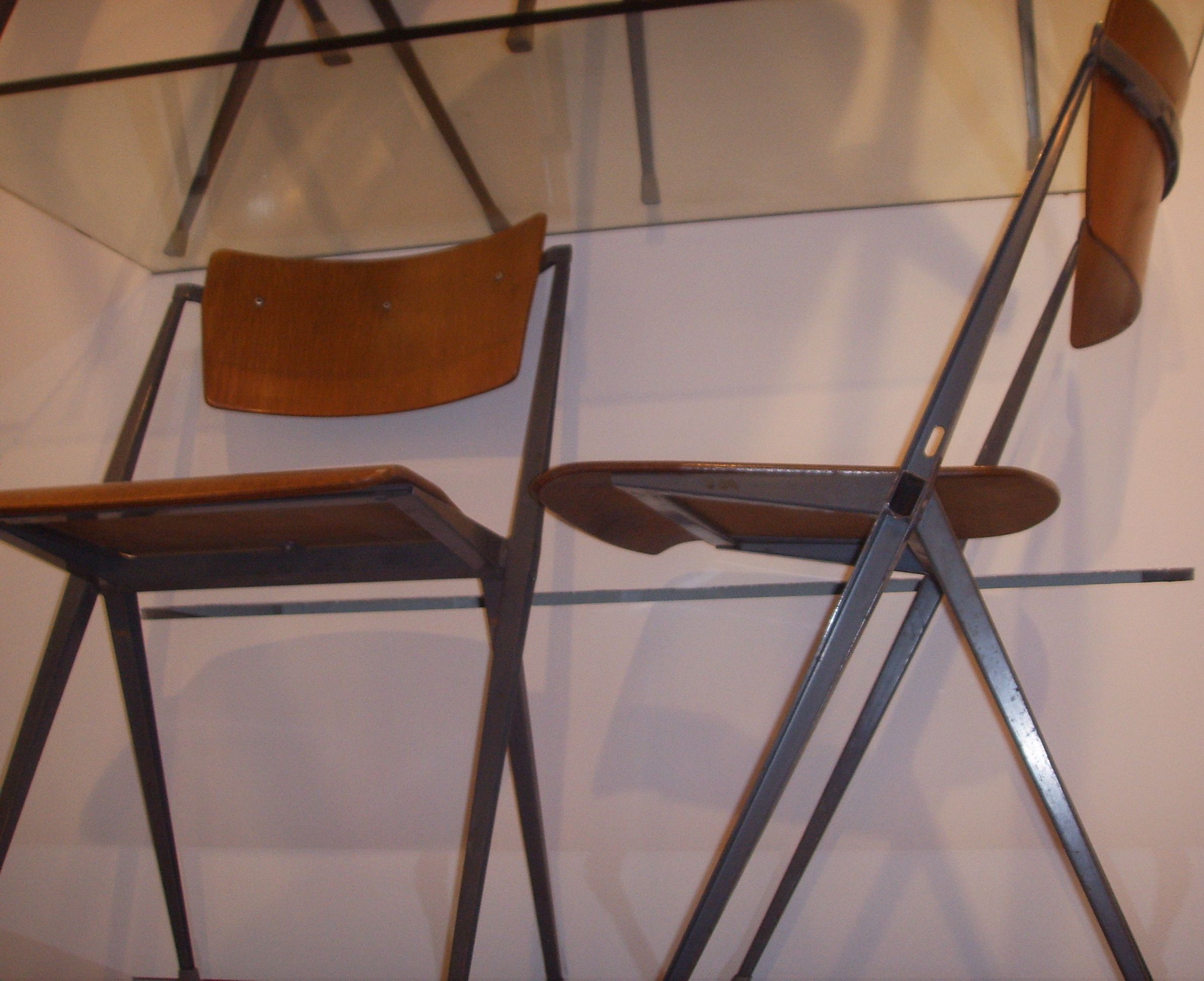
Chair designed for De Cirkel / Ahrend

Next, Rietveld started working for De Cirkel (a daughter of Ahrend), a company that also produced steel furniture, where he became a colleague of Friso Kramer. There, Rietveld produced his Pyramid chair and worked on the Reply drawing table together with Kramer. Rietveld was employed at De Cirkel until 1970. He also worked as a freelancer on various assignments. One of his contractors was Vicon, a producer of farming equipment, from 1959 till 1979. Together with Wim Groeneboom, Rietveld designed the first Amsterdam metro, he drew the Dutch 'standard bus' (1966), and he was contracted by companies such as Werkspoor (train interiors) and Inventum (home appliances).

== Teaching ==
From 1960 till 1975, Rietveld was a teacher at the Royal Academy of Art in The Hague, and from 1970 till 1979 at the Technische Hogeschool (the later University of Technology) in Delft, where he held a professorship from 1973.

== Literature ==
- Van Hinte, E. (1996). Wim Rietveld, industrieel ontwerper (in Dutch). Rotterdam: 010. ISBN 9789064501678.
