= Red and Blue Chair =

Chair designed in 1917 by Gerrit Rietveld

- Chair in the Toledo Museum of Art
- Designer: Gerrit Rietveld
- Date: 1918
- Materials: Lacquered wood
- Style / tradition: De Stijl
- Height: 88 cm (35 in)
- Width: 66 cm (26 in)
- Depth: 83 cm (33 in)

The Red and Blue Chair is a chair designed in 1917 by Gerrit Rietveld. It represents one of the first explorations by the De Stijl art movement in three dimensions. It was not painted its distinct colors until the early 1920s. Multiple versions of the chair exist and are housed in various collections.

== History ==
The Red and Blue Chair is a chair designed in 1917 by Gerrit Rietveld. It represents one of the first explorations by the De Stijl art movement in three dimensions. It features several Rietveld joints.

The original chair was constructed of unstained beech wood and was not painted red, blue, yellow, and black until around 1923. Fellow member of De Stijl and architect, Bart van der Leck, saw his original model and suggested that he add bright colours. He built the new model of thinner wood and painted it entirely black with areas of primary colors attributed to De Stijl movement. The effect of this color scheme made the chair seem to almost disappear against the black walls and floor of the Rietveld Schröder House, where it was later placed. The areas of color appeared to float, giving it an almost transparent structure.

A version of the chair was sold by Christies in 2011 for €10,625.

== Construction ==
The chair embodies one of the principles of machine aesthetic, the erasing of distinctions between the load and support through a set of interlocking elements: the (red) back plays the role of the load (supported by a crossbar underneath the seat) and provides support for the arms at the same time.

In Rietveld's instructions on how to build the chair, he informs the craftsperson to print the following verse from Der Aesthet by Christian Morgenstern and attach it under the seat:

Wenn Ich sitze, möchte Ich nicht
sitzen, wie Mein Sitzfleisch möchte
sondern wie Mein Sitzgeist sich,
säße er, den Stuhl sich flöchte.

Translation:

When I sit, I do not want
to sit like my seat-flesh likes
but rather like my seat-mind would,
if he were sitting, weave the chair for himself.

Rietveld did not maintain an authoritative specification of the measurements or colours and there are various versions of the chair.

== Collections ==
The Museum of Modern Art houses the chair in its permanent collection—a gift from Philip Johnson—and an original example is on display at the Brooklyn Museum in New York City. Versions of the chair are also on display at the High Museum of Art in Atlanta and the Toledo Museum of Art in Toledo, Ohio.

The Red and Blue Chair was on loan to the Delft University of Technology Faculty of Architecture as part of an exhibition when a fire destroyed the entire building in May 2008. The Red and Blue Chair was saved by firefighters.

== See also ==
- Zig-Zag Chair

== Sources ==
- Spurr, David (2016). "The Machine Aesthetic in Joyce and De Stijl". European Joyce Studies. 24. Brill: 7–19. ISSN 0923-9855. JSTOR 44871383.
