= Bertus Mulder =

Dutch architect (1929–2024)

- Born: Albertus Johannes Mulder; 31 January 1929; Dedemsvaart, Netherlands
- Died: 20 May 2024 (aged 95)
- Occupation: Architect

Albertus Johannes "Bertus" Mulder (31 January 1929 – 20 May 2024) was a Dutch architect and writer. He became an expert on Gerrit Rietveld and also wrote multiple reference works about him and his works.

== Biography ==
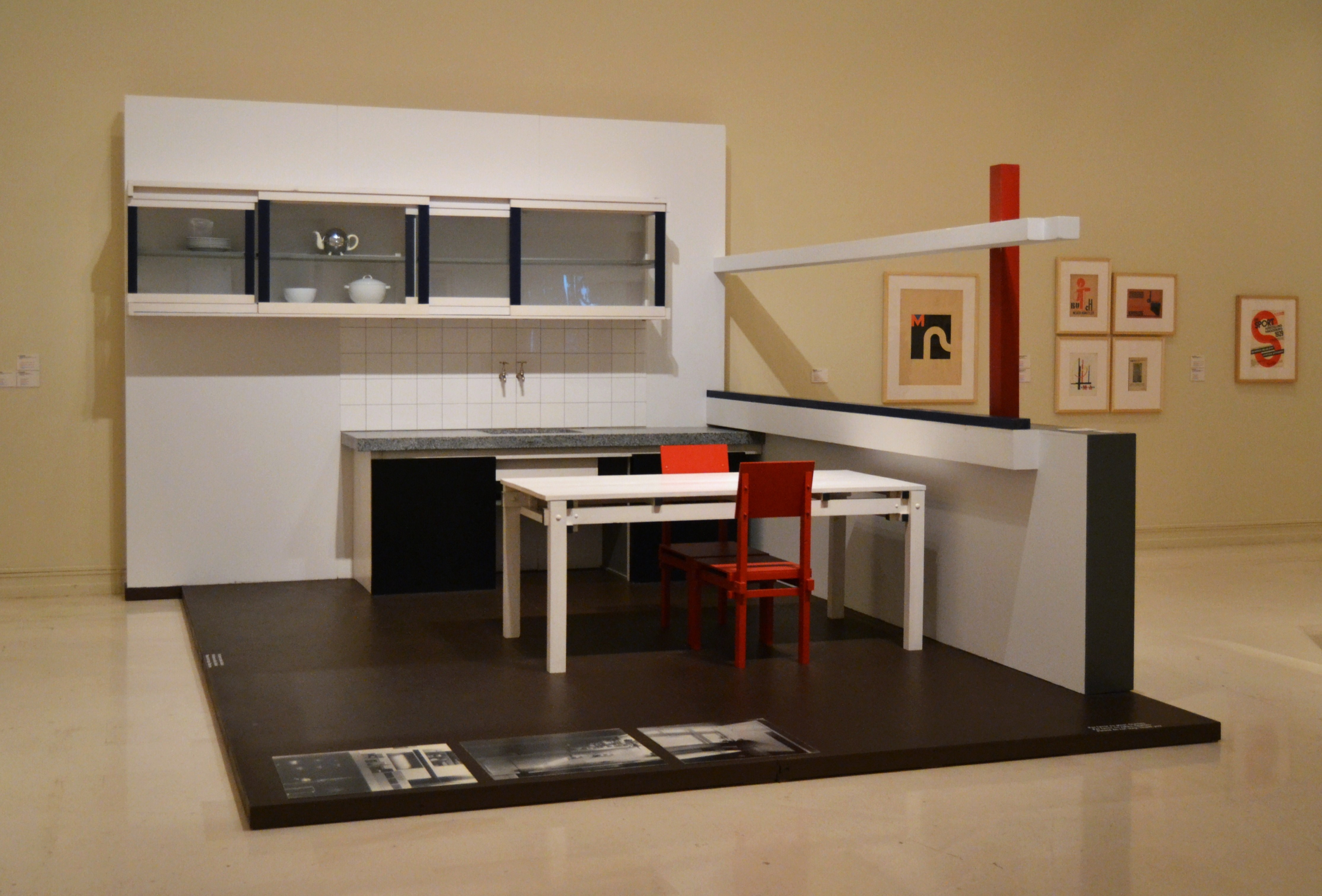
Model of the kitchen of the Rietveld Schröder House re-designed by Mulder

Mulder was born on 31 January 1929 in Dedemsvaart. In 1959 he became an independent architect in Utrecht. In the 1960s he worked together with Gerrit Rietveld who became his main source of inspiration. Mulder was the architect of the exhibition pavilion near Leidsche Rijn Centrum and is known for restoring the Rietveld Schröder House in 1987, restoring the Zuiderbad in Amsterdam-Zuid and expanding the Theehuis Rhijnauwen. He also published several books, most of them about Gerrit Rietveld.

Mulder had three children. According to his son Marco Mulder, Gerrit Rietveld was the spiritual father of Bertus Mulder. Mulder died on 20 May 2024, aged 95.
