= Gerrit Rietveld =

Dutch furniture designer and architect

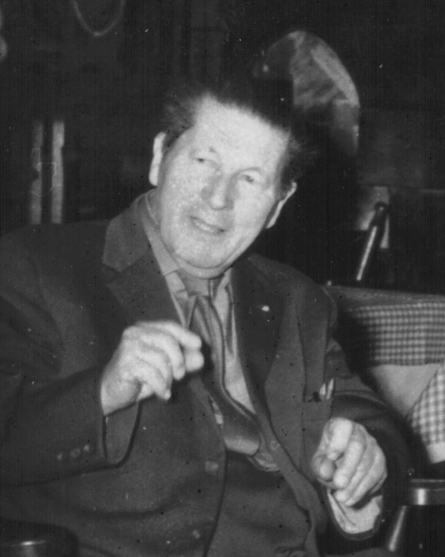
- Rietveld in 1962
- Born: Gerrit Thomas Rietveld; 24 June 1888; Utrecht, Netherlands
- Died: 25 June 1964 (aged 76); Utrecht, Netherlands
- Occupations: Furniture designer and architect

Gerrit Rietveld (24 June 1888 – 25 June 1964) was a Dutch furniture designer and architect.

== Early life ==
Rietveld was born in Utrecht on August 1888 as the son of a joiner. He left school at 11 to be apprenticed to his father and enrolled at night school before working as a draughtsman for C. J. Begeer, a jeweller in Utrecht, from 1906 to 1911.

== De Stijl ==
By the time he opened his own furniture workshop in 1917, Rietveld had taught himself drawing, painting and model-making. He afterwards set up in business as a cabinet-maker.

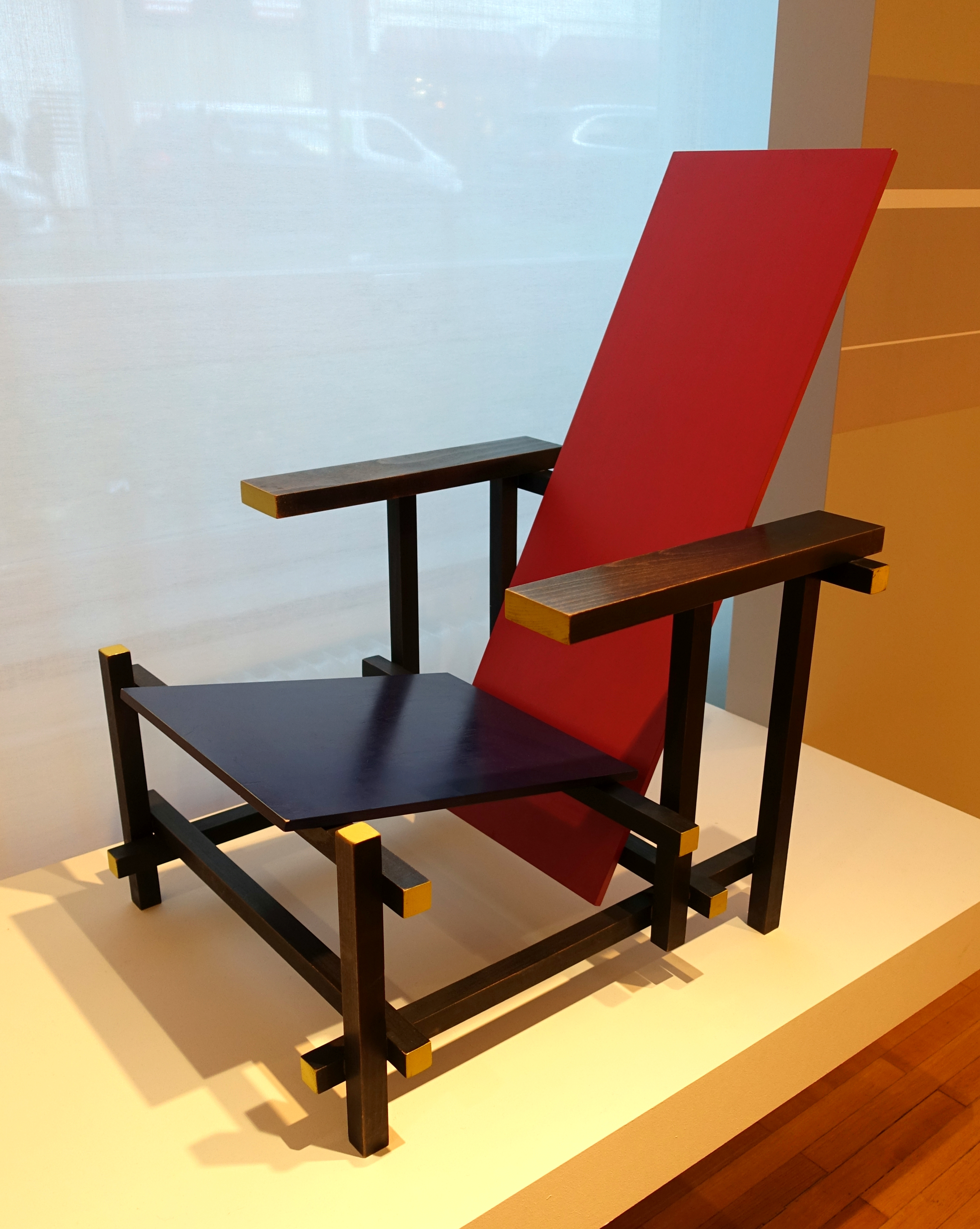
Red and Blue Chair in the Museum für Angewandte Kunst in Cologne

Rietveld designed his Red and Blue Chair in 1917 which has become an iconic piece of modern furniture. Hoping that much of his furniture would eventually be mass-produced rather than handcrafted, Rietveld aimed for simplicity in construction. In 1918, he started his own furniture factory, and changed the chair's colours after becoming influenced by the De Stijl movement, of which he became a member in 1919, the same year in which he became an architect. The contacts that he made at De Stijl gave him the opportunity to exhibit abroad as well. In 1923, Walter Gropius invited Rietveld to exhibit at the Bauhaus.

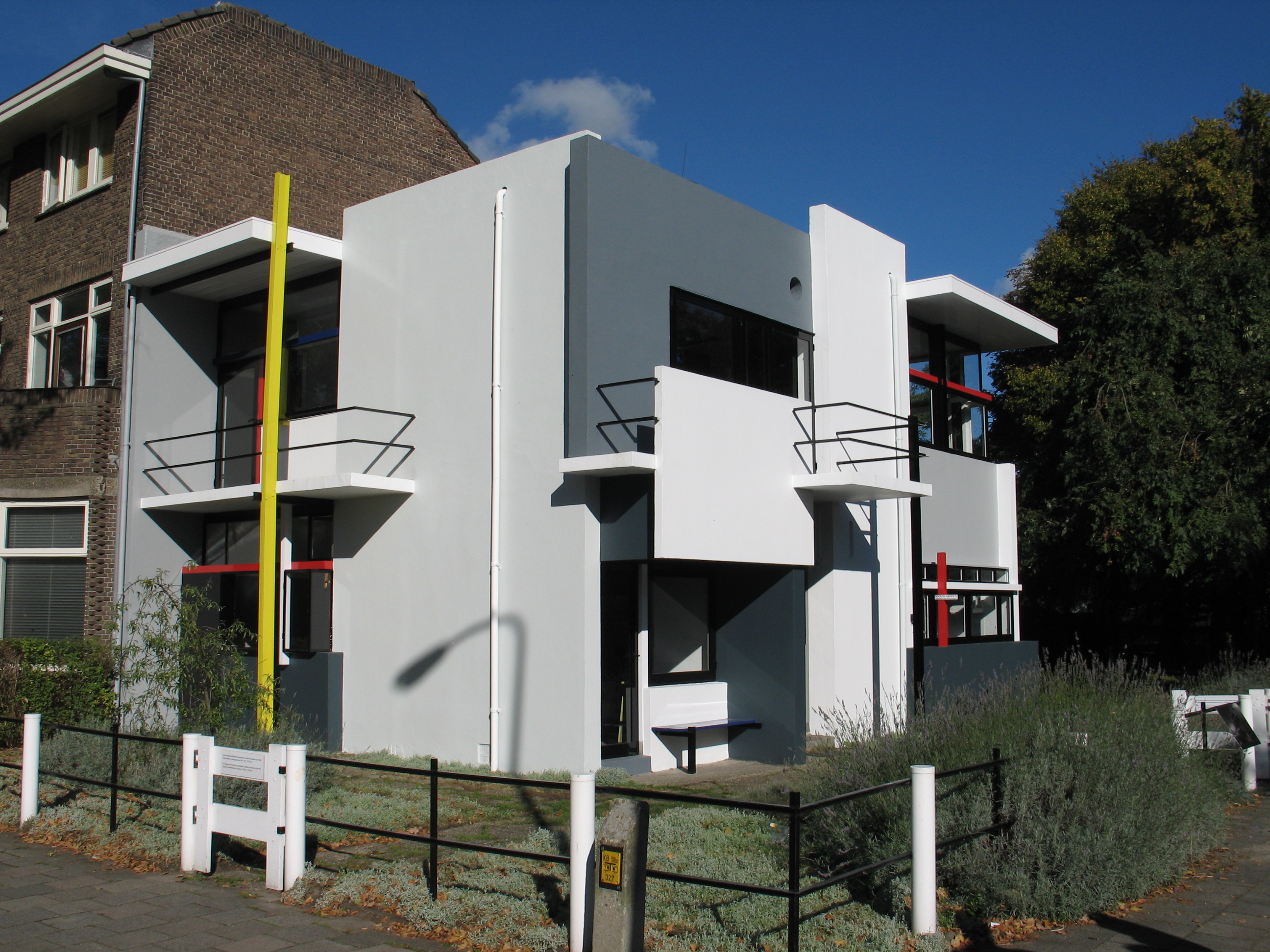
Rietveld Schröder House in Utrecht in 2010

He built the Rietveld Schröder House, in 1924, in close collaboration with the owner Truus Schröder-Schräder. Built in Utrecht on the Prins Hendriklaan 50, the house has a conventional ground floor, but is radical on the top floor, lacking fixed walls but instead relying on sliding walls to create and change living spaces. The house has been a UNESCO World Heritage Site since 2000. His involvement in the Schröder House exerted a strong influence on Truus' daughter, Han Schröder, who became one of the first female architects in the Netherlands.

== Nieuwe Zakelijkheid ==
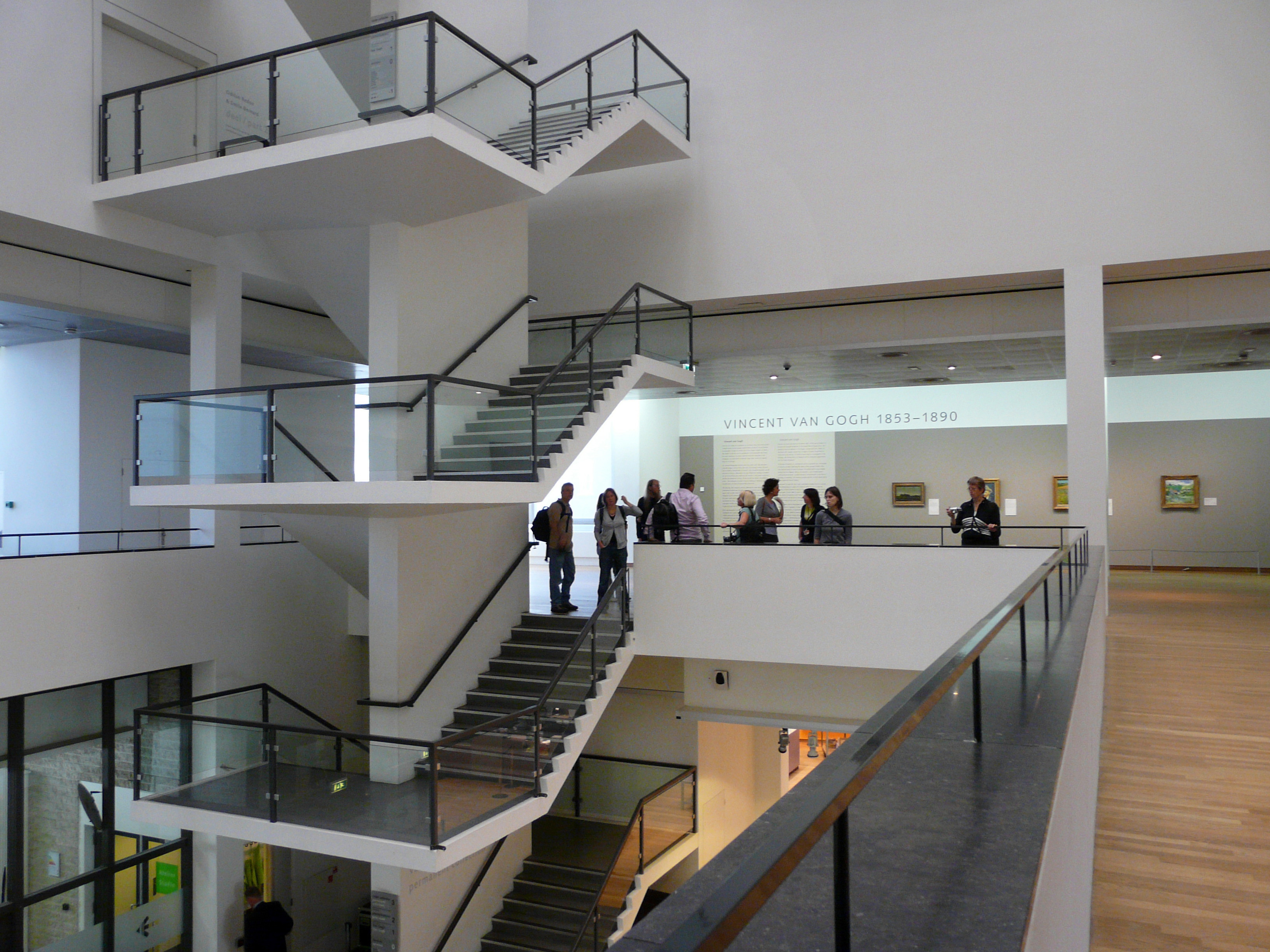
Interior of the Van Gogh Museum in Amsterdam in 2009

Rietveld broke with De Stijl in 1928 and became associated with a more functionalist style of architecture, known as either Nieuwe Zakelijkheid or Nieuwe Bouwen. The same year he joined the Congrès Internationaux d'Architecture Moderne. From the late 1920s he was concerned with social housing, inexpensive production methods, new materials, prefabrication and standardisation. In 1927 he was already experimenting with prefabricated concrete slabs, a very unusual material at that time. In the 1920s and 1930s, however, all his commissions came from private individuals, and it was not until the 1950s that he was able to put his progressive ideas about social housing into practice, in projects in Utrecht and Reeuwijk.

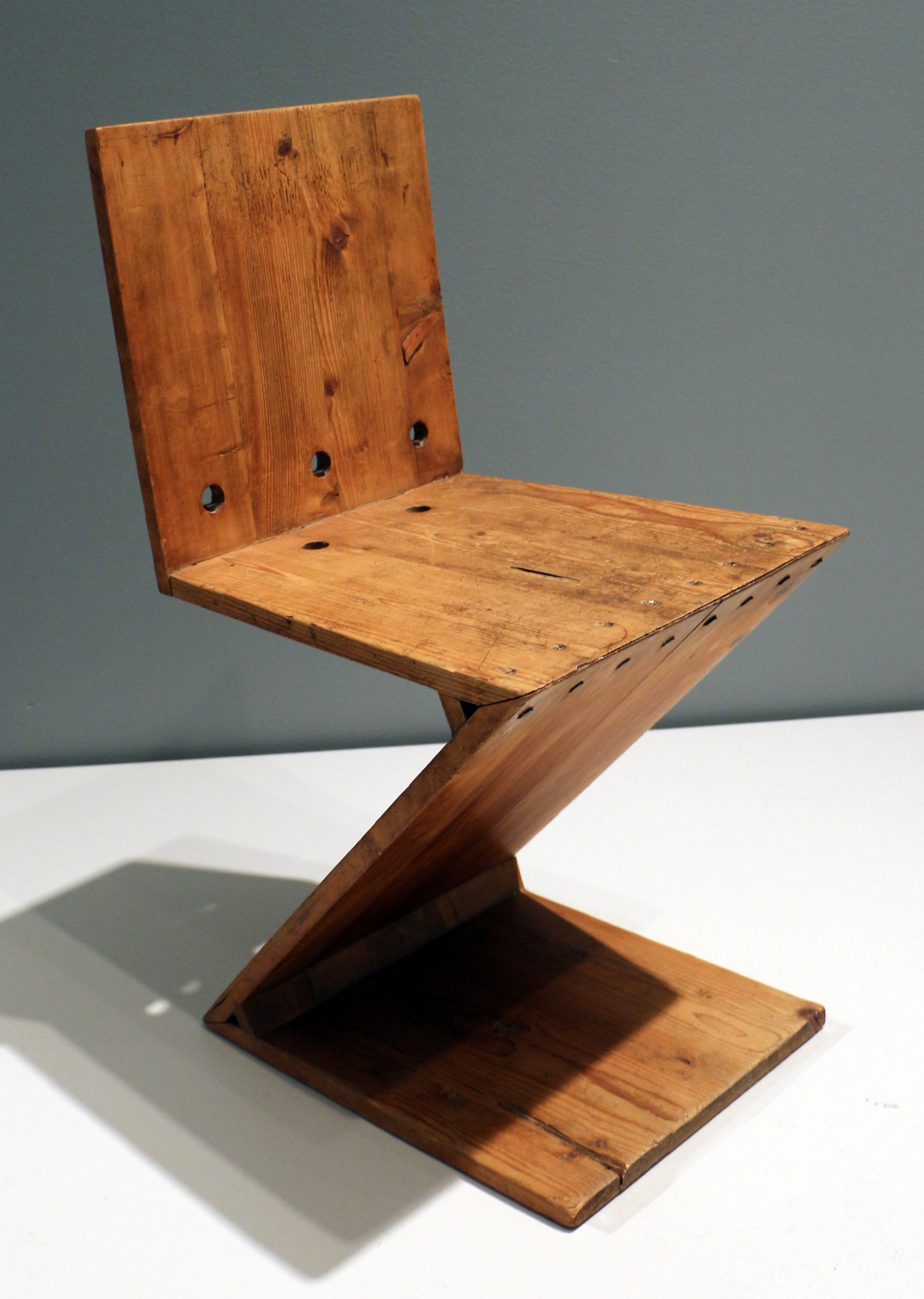
Zig-Zag Chair in the Carnegie Museum of Art in Pittsburgh

Rietveld designed the Zig-Zag Chair in 1934 and started the design of the Van Gogh Museum in Amsterdam, which was finished after his death.

== De Stijl revival ==
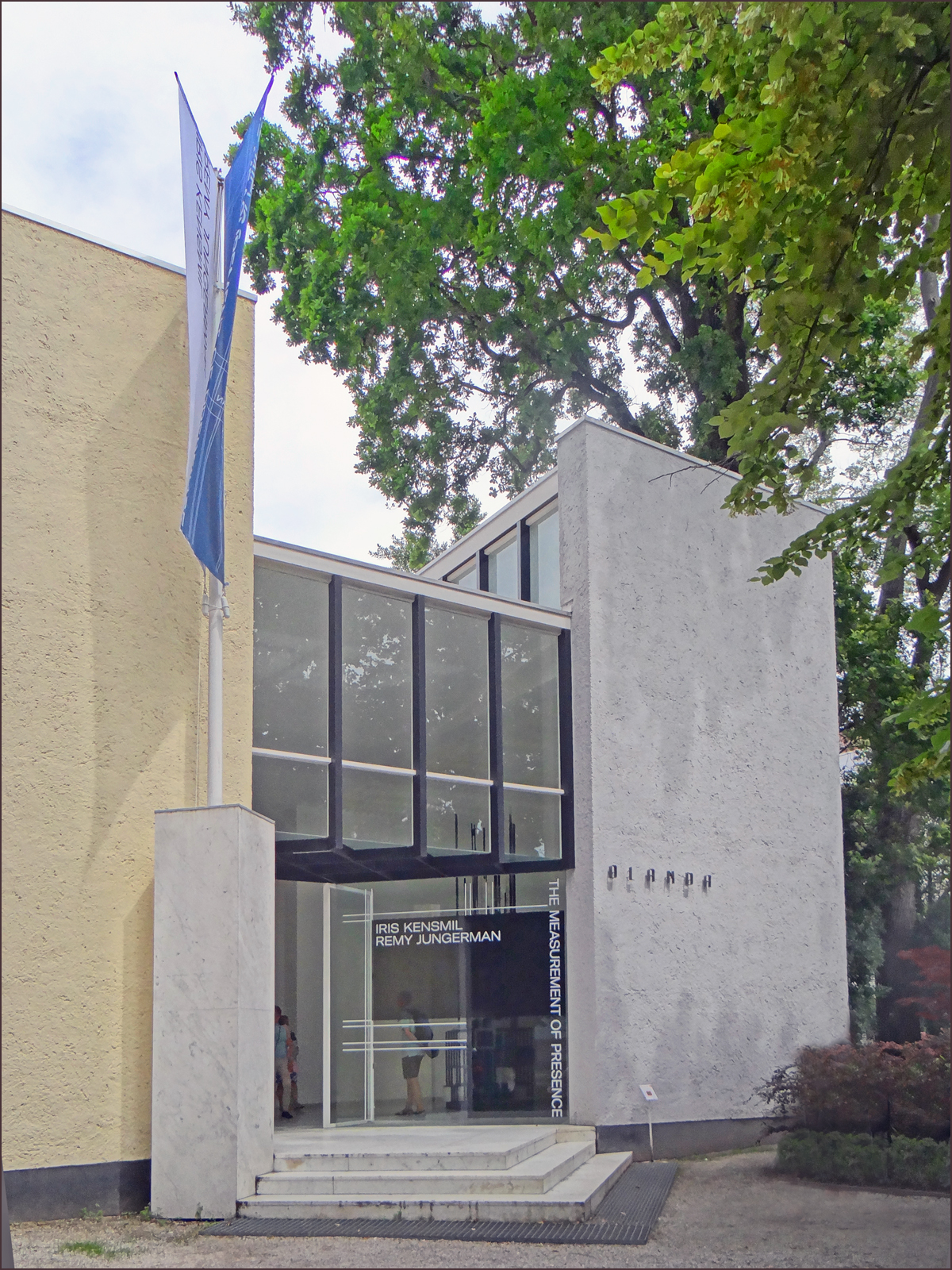
Dutch pavilion for the 1953 Venice Biennale in 2019

In 1951 Rietveld designed a retrospective exhibition about De Stijl which was held in Amsterdam, Venice and New York. Interest in his work revived as a result. In subsequent years he was given many commissions, including the Dutch pavilion for the Venice Biennale (1953), the art academies in Amsterdam and Arnhem, and the press room for the UNESCO building in Paris. Designed for the display of small sculptures at the Third International Sculpture Exhibition in Arnhem's Sonsbeek Park in 1955, Rietveld's 'Sonsbeek Pavilion' was rebuilt at the Kröller-Müller Museum in 1965. Due to irreparable damages caused by regular decay, it was once again rebuilt, this time with new materials, in 2010. In order to handle all these projects, in 1961 Rietveld set up a partnership with the architects Johan van Dillen and J. van Tricht built hundreds of homes, many of them in the city of Utrecht.

His work was neglected when rationalism came into vogue, but he later benefited from a revival of the style of the 1920s thirty years later.

== Death ==
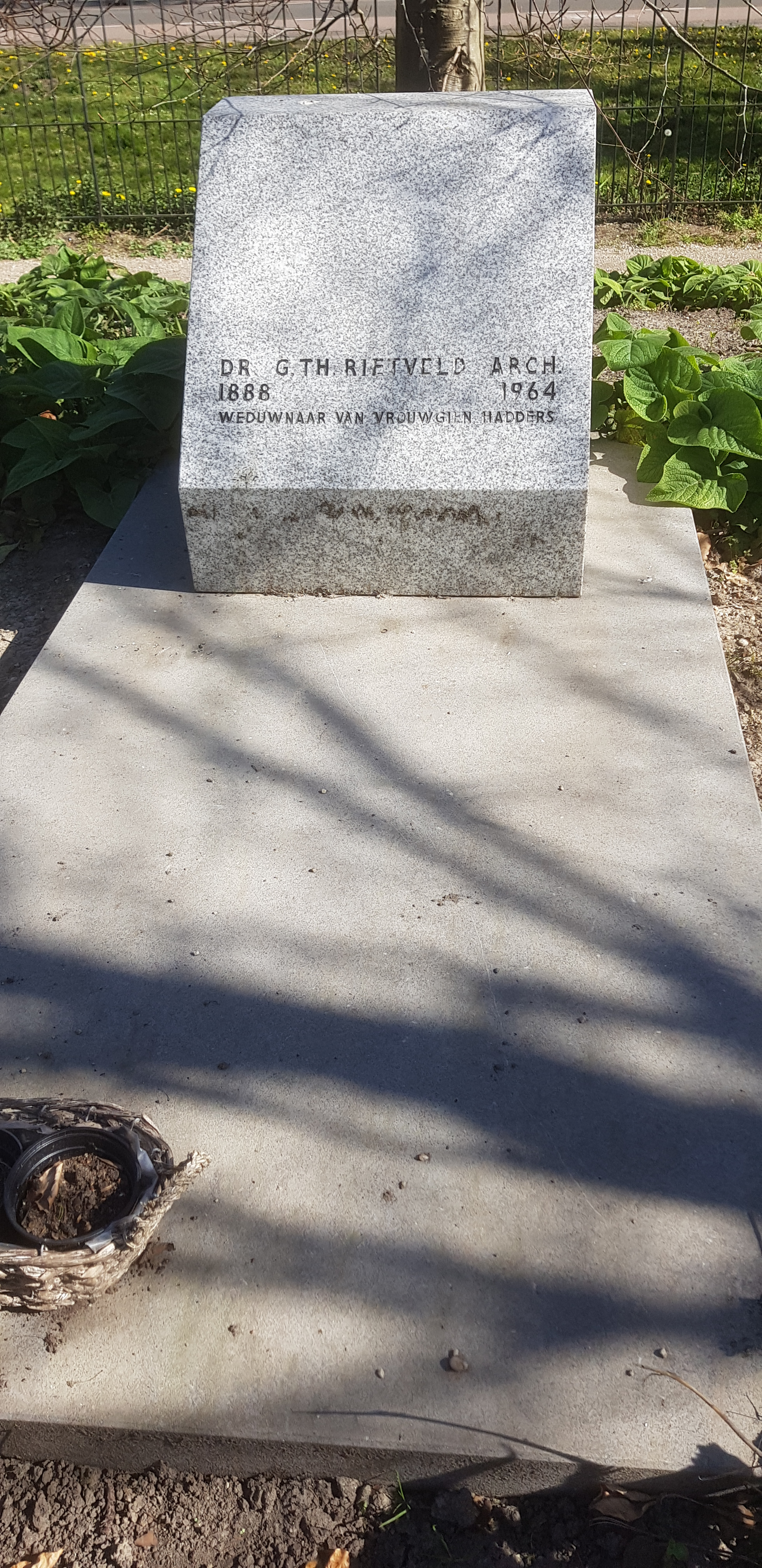
Grave of Gerrit Rietveld

Rietveld died on 25 June 1964 in Utrecht.

His son Wim Rietveld also became a renowned industrial designer.

== Recognition ==
Rietveld had his first retrospective exhibition devoted to his architectural work at the Central Museum, Utrecht, in 1958. When the art academy in Amsterdam became part of the higher professional education system in 1968 and was given the status of an Academy for Fine Arts and Design, the name was changed to the Gerrit Rietveld Academy in honour of Rietveld. "Gerrit Rietveld: A Centenary Exhibition" at the Barry Friedman Gallery, New York, in 1988 was the first comprehensive presentation of the Dutch architect's original works ever held in the U.S. The highlight of a celebratory "Rietveld Year" in Utrecht, the exhibition "Rietveld's Universe" opened at the Centraal Museum and compared him and his work with famous contemporaries like Wright, Le Corbusier and Mies van der Rohe.

Two software tools, both for code review, have been named after Gerrit Rietveld: Gerrit and Rietveld.
