= Rietveld Schröder House =

House in Utrecht, Netherlands

- Rietveld Schröderhuis
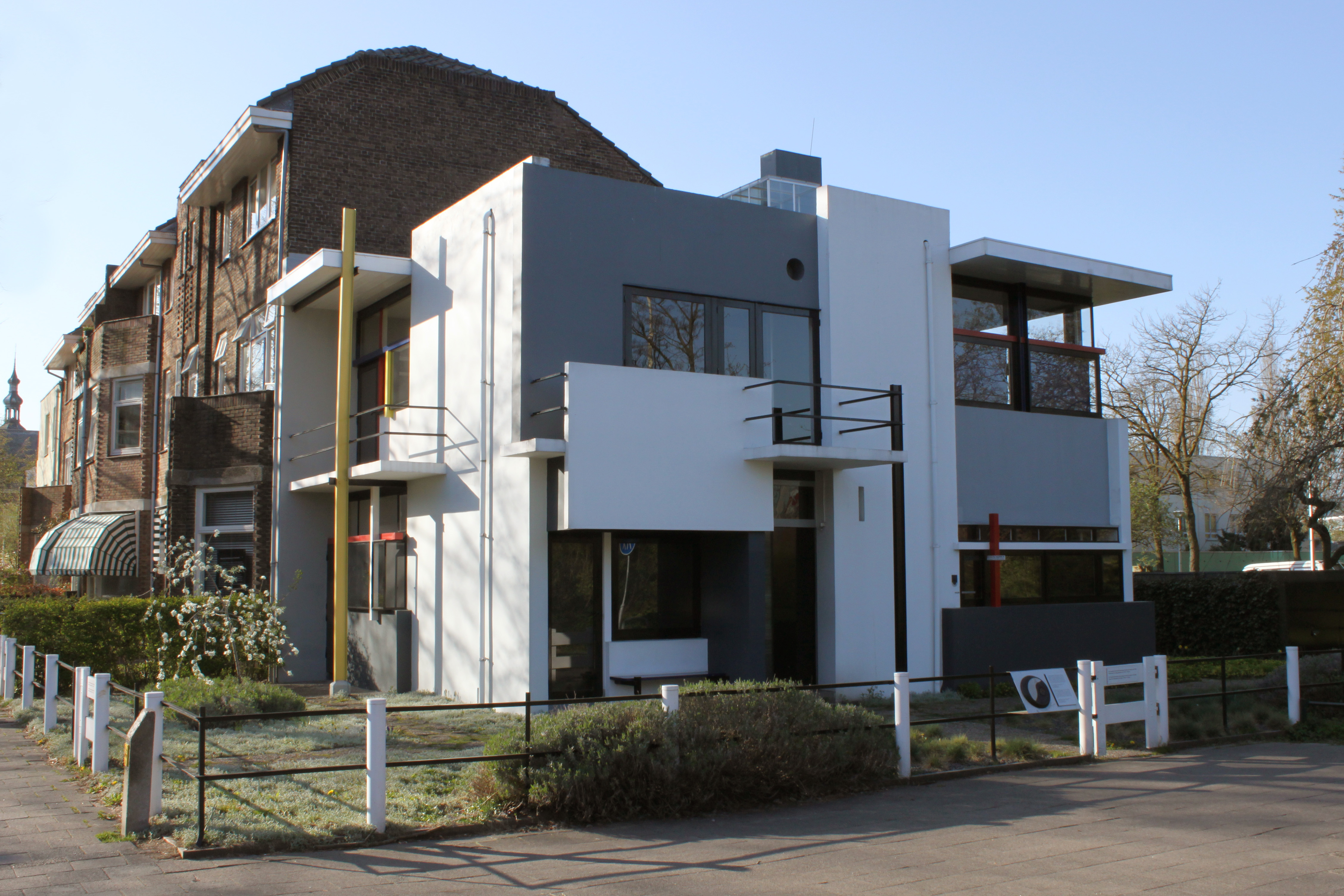
- The exterior of the Rietveld Schröder House
- Interactive map of the Rietveld Schröder House area

General information
- Architectural style: De Stijl
- Location: Utrecht, Netherlands
- Coordinates: 52°5′7″N 5°8′50″E
- Completed: 1924

Design and construction
- Architect: Gerrit Rietveld

UNESCO World Heritage Site
- Official name: Rietveld Schröderhuis (Rietveld Schröder House)
- Type: Cultural
- Criteria: i, ii
- Designated: 2000 (24th session)
- Reference no.: 965
- Region: Europe and North America

The Rietveld Schröder House (Dutch: Rietveld Schröderhuis; also known as the Schröder House) in Utrecht (Prins Hendriklaan 50) was built in 1924 by Dutch architect Gerrit Rietveld for Mrs. Truus Schröder-Schräder and her three children.

She commissioned the house to be designed preferably without walls. Both Rietveld and Schröder espoused progressive ideals that included "a fierce commitment to a new openness about relationships within their own families and to truth in their emotional lives. Bourgeois notions of respectability and propriety, with their emphasis on discipline, hierarchy, and containment would be eliminated through architectural design that countered each of these aspects in a conscious and systematic way." Rietveld worked side by side with Schröder-Schräder to create the house. He sketched the first possible design for the building; Schröder-Schrader was not pleased. She envisioned a house that was free from association and could create a connection between the inside and outside. The house is one of the best known examples of De Stijl-architecture and arguably the only true De Stijl building. Mrs. Schröder lived in the house until her death in 1985. The house was restored by Bertus Mulder and now is a museum open for visits, run by the Centraal Museum. It is a listed monument since 1976 and UNESCO World Heritage Site since 2000.

== Architecture ==
The Rietveld Schröder House constitutes both inside and outside a radical break with all architecture before it. The two-storey house is situated in Utrecht, at the end of a terrace, but it makes no attempt to relate to its neighbouring buildings (although it shares an exterior wall with the last house in the terrace). It faces a motorway built in the 1960s.

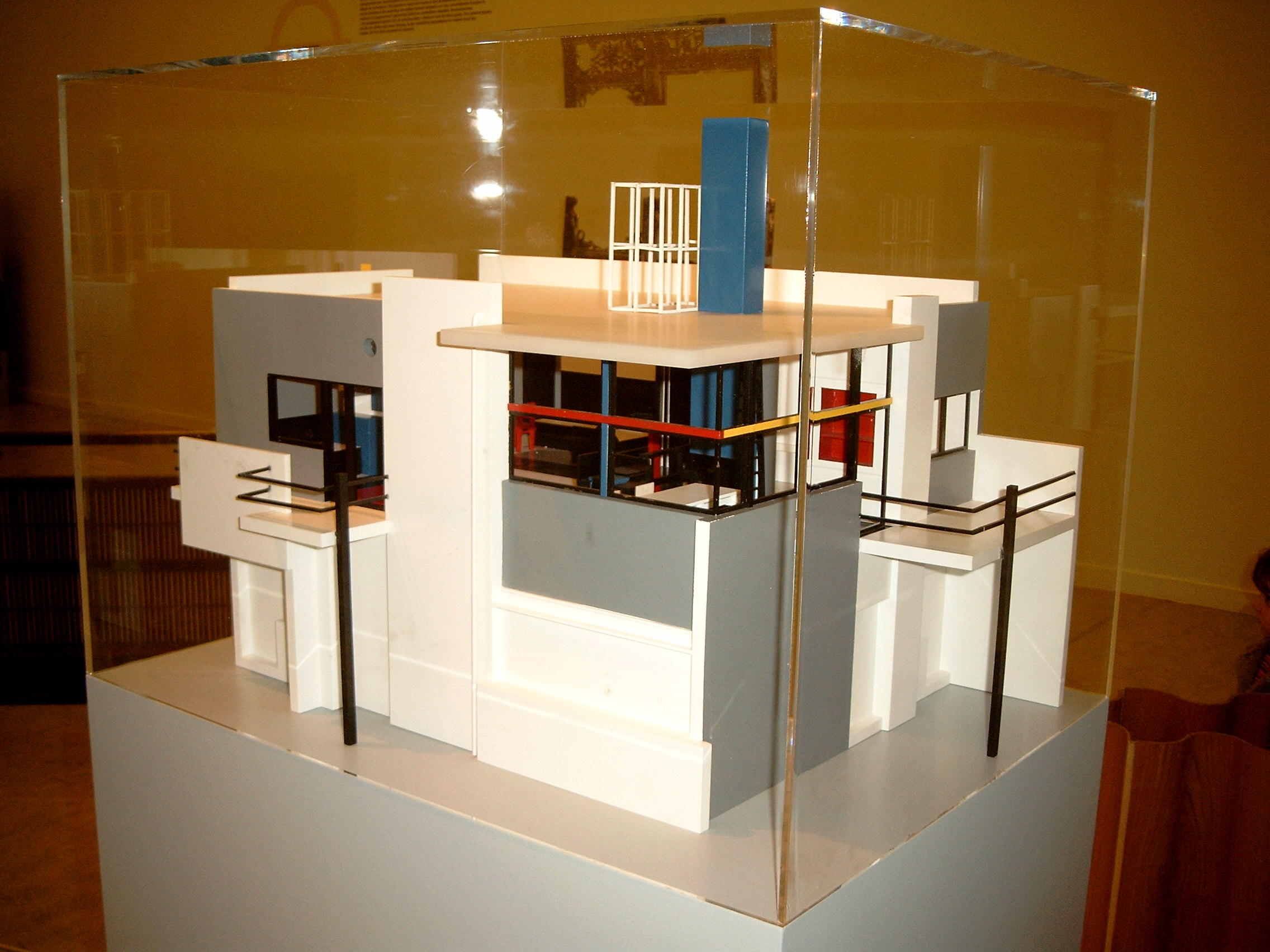
Architectural model, ca 1985

Inside there is no static accumulation of rooms, but a dynamic, changeable open zone. The ground floor can still be termed traditional; ranged around a central staircase are kitchen and three sit/bedrooms. Additionally, the house included a garage, which was very strange because Truus did not own a car. The living area upstairs, stated as being an attic to satisfy the fire regulations of the planning authorities, in fact forms a large open zone except for a separate toilet and a bathroom. Rietveld wanted to leave the upper level as it was. Mrs Schröder, however, felt that as living space it should be usable in either form, open or subdivided. This was achieved with a system of sliding and revolving panels. Mrs Schröder used these panels to open up the space of the second floor to allow more of an open area for her and her 3 children, leaving the option of closing or separating the rooms when desired. A sliding wall between the living area and the son's room blocks a cupboard as well as a light switch. Therefore, a circular opening was made within the sliding wall. When entirely partitioned in, the living level comprises three bedrooms, bathroom and living room. In-between this and the open state is a wide variety of possible permutations, each providing its own spatial experience.

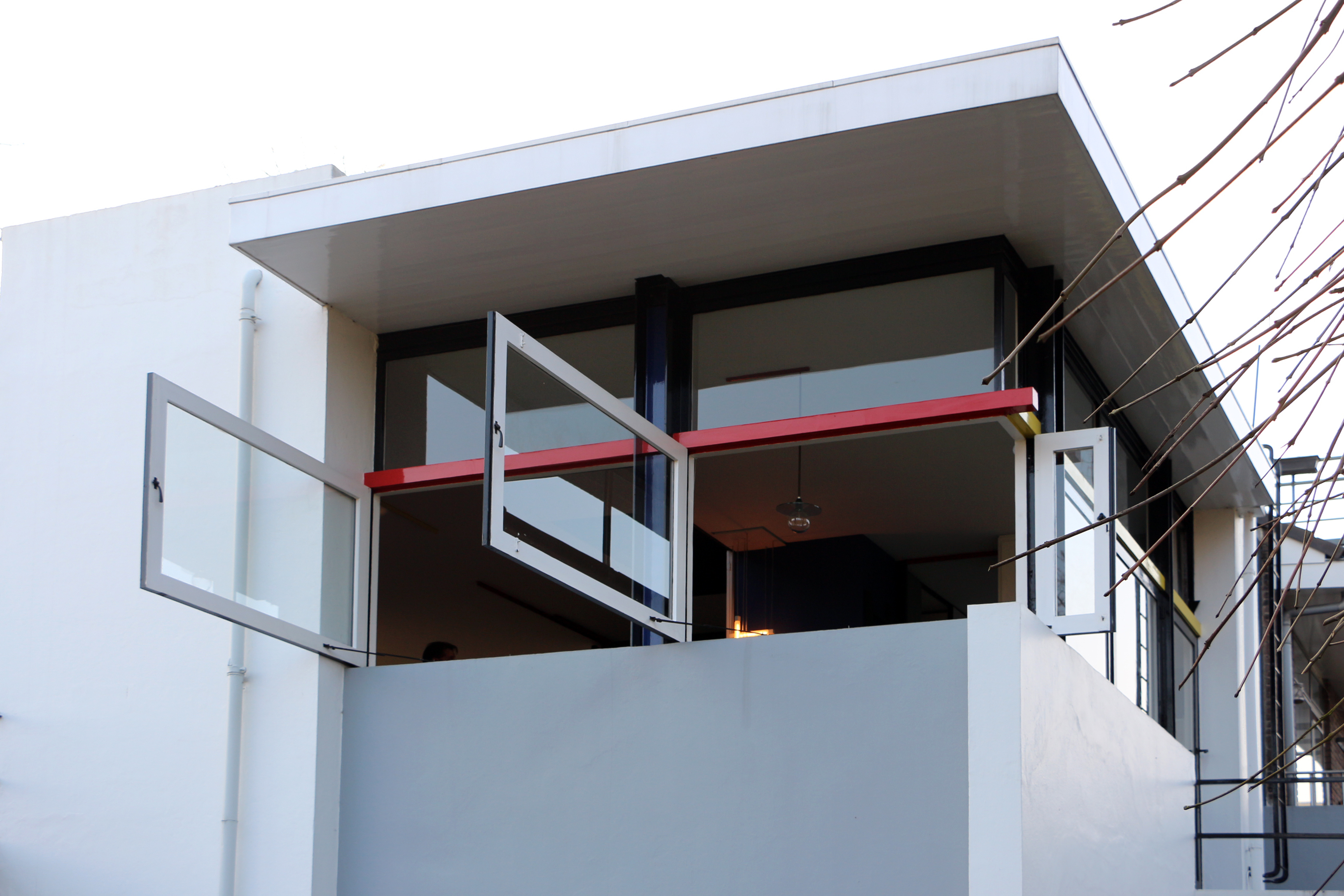
The "invisible corner"

The facades are a collage of planes and lines whose components are purposely detached from, and seem to glide past, one another. This enabled the provision of several balconies. Like Rietveld's Red and Blue Chair, each component has its own form, position and colour. Colours were chosen as to strengthen the plasticity of the facades; surfaces in white and shades of grey, black window and doorframes, and a number of linear elements in primary colours.

In the machine aesthetic tradition, there is little distinction between interior and exterior space. The rectilinear lines and planes flow from outside to inside, with the same colour palette and surfaces. Even the windows are hinged so that they can only open 90 degrees to the wall, preserving strict design standards about intersecting planes, and further blurring the delineation of inside and out. The architect was trying to avoid an appearance of a monolithic mass.

== Construction ==
Initially, Rietveld wanted to construct the house out of concrete. It turned out that it would be too expensive to do that on such a small building. The foundations and the balconies were the only parts of the building that were made out of concrete. The walls were made of brick and plaster. The window frames and doors were made from wood as well as the floors, which were supported by wooden beams. To support the building, steel girders with wire mesh were used.

== Legacy ==
Only a few years after construction of this building Polish architect Stanisław Brukalski built his own house in Warsaw in 1929 likely inspired by Rietveld Schröderhuis which he visited. His Polish example of modern house was awarded bronze medal at the Paris expo in 1937.

The house was honored in two euro coins issued by the Royal Dutch Mint in 2013.

The World Heritage Committee inscribed the Rietveld Schröder House on the UNESCO list of World Heritage Sites on 2 December 2000, during the 24th session in Cairns, Australia. The committee decided to apply criterion i and ii, and said about the house:

The Rietveld Schröderhuis in Utrecht is an icon of the Modern Movement in architecture and an outstanding expression of human creative genius in its purity of ideas and concepts as developed by the De Stijl movement. (...) With its radical approach to design and the use of space, the Rietveld Schröderhuis occupies a seminal position in the development of architecture in the modern age.

== Gallery ==
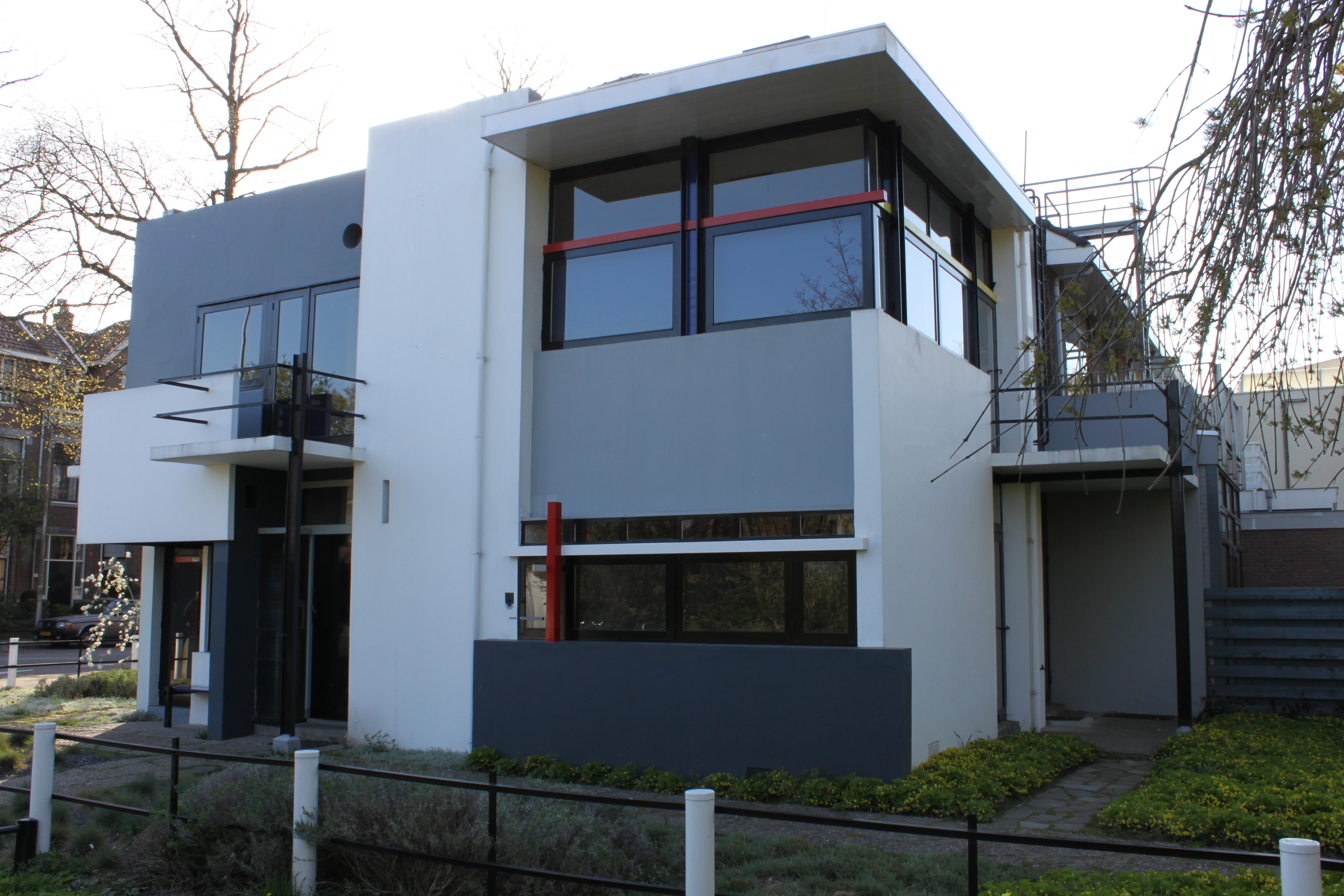

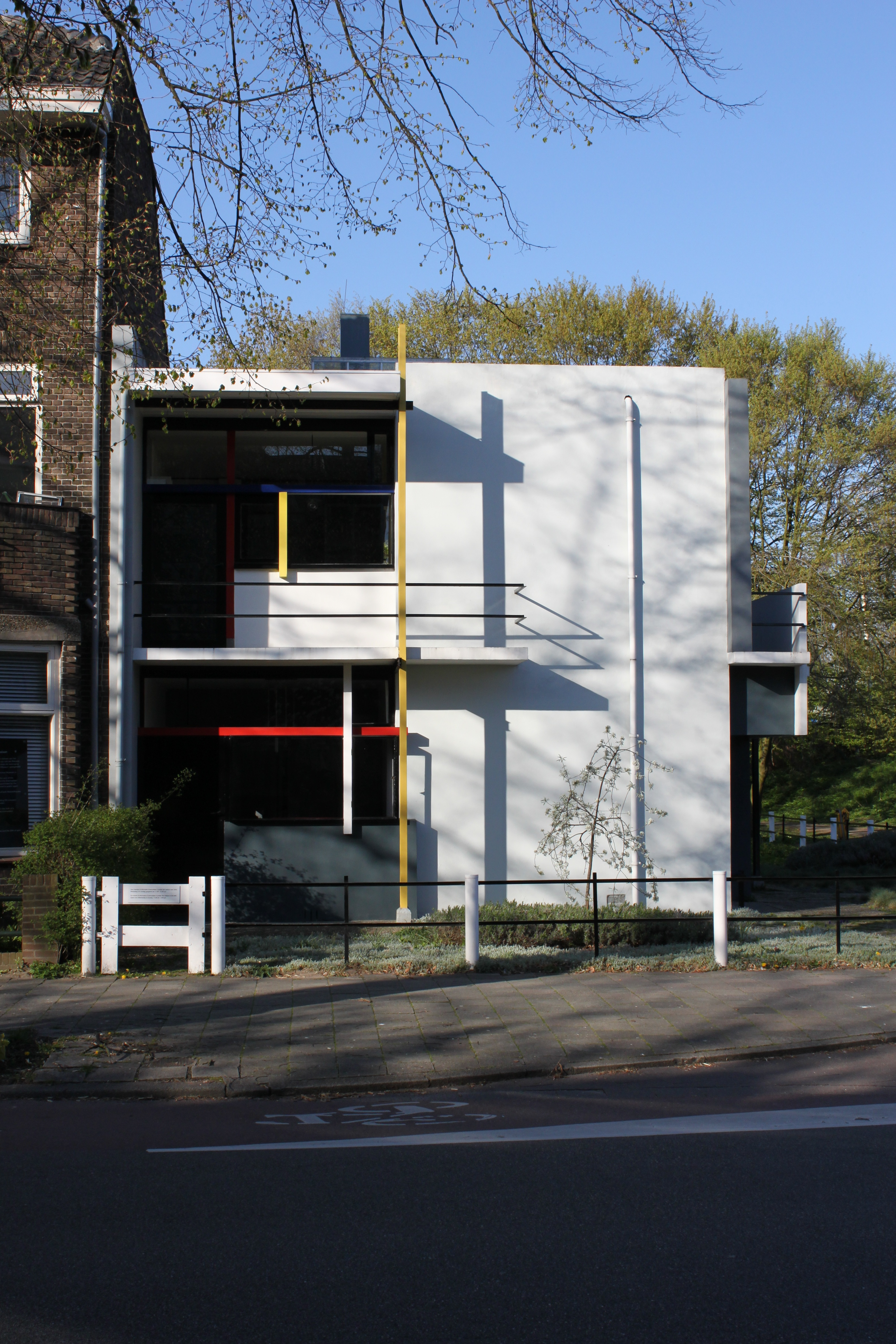

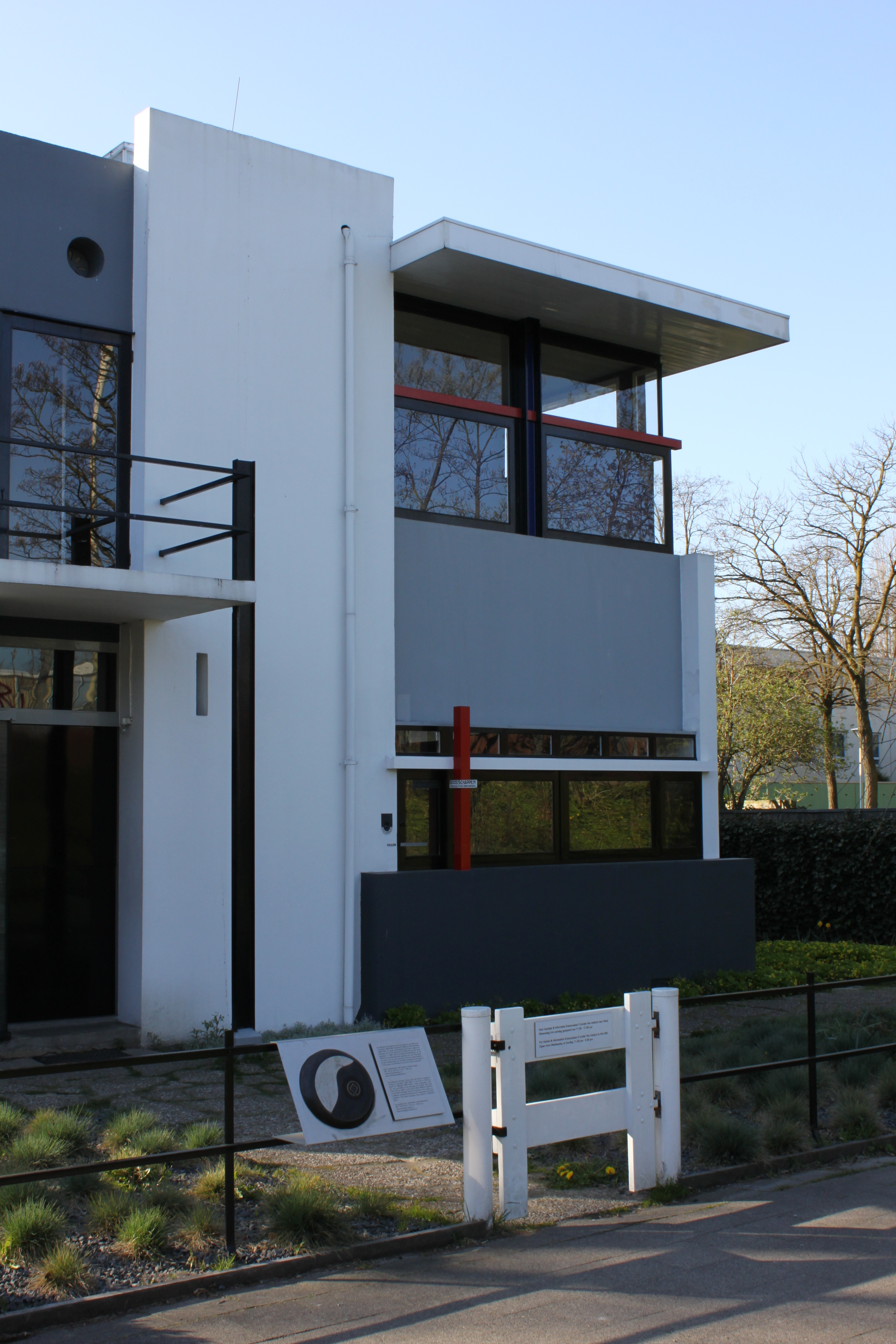

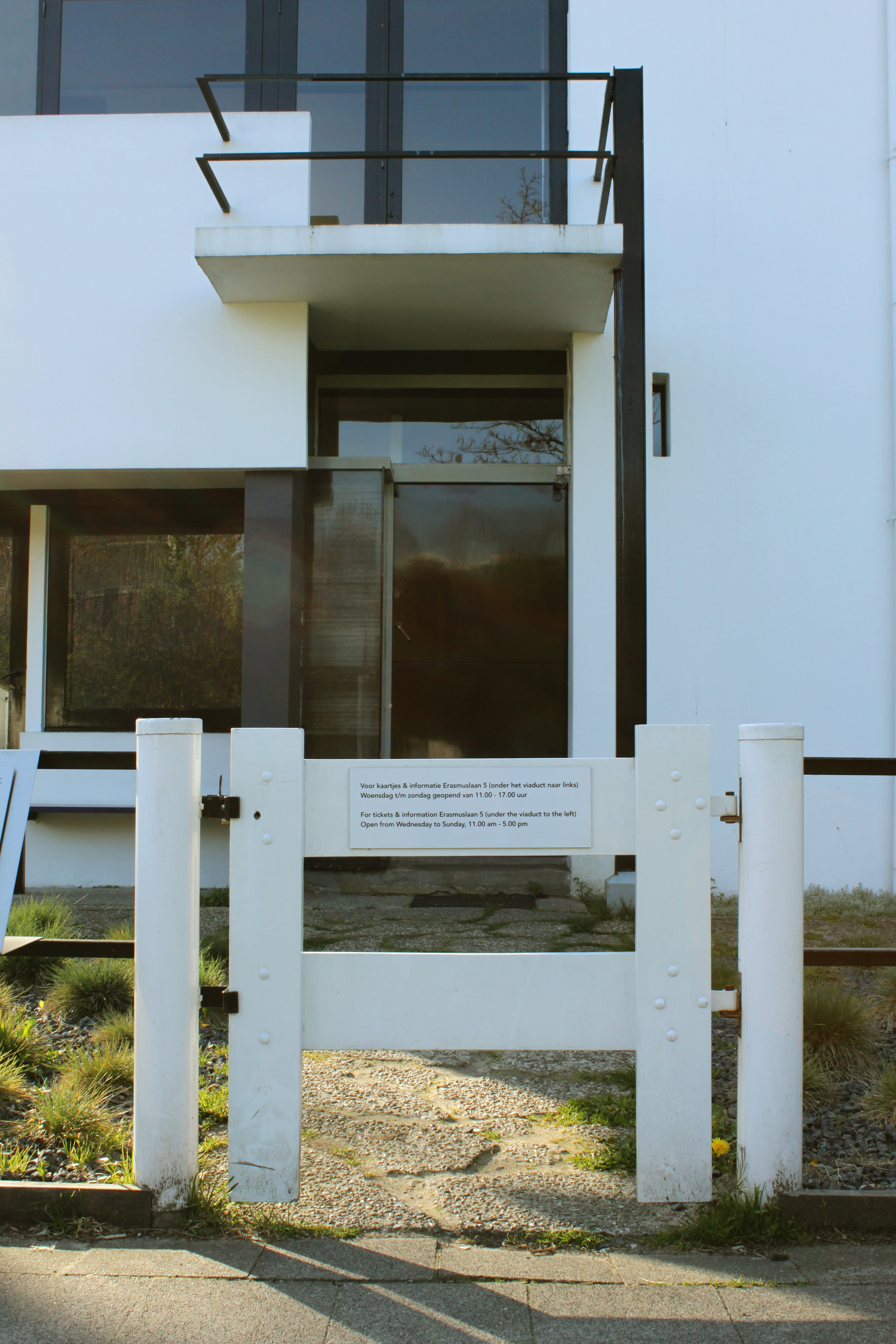

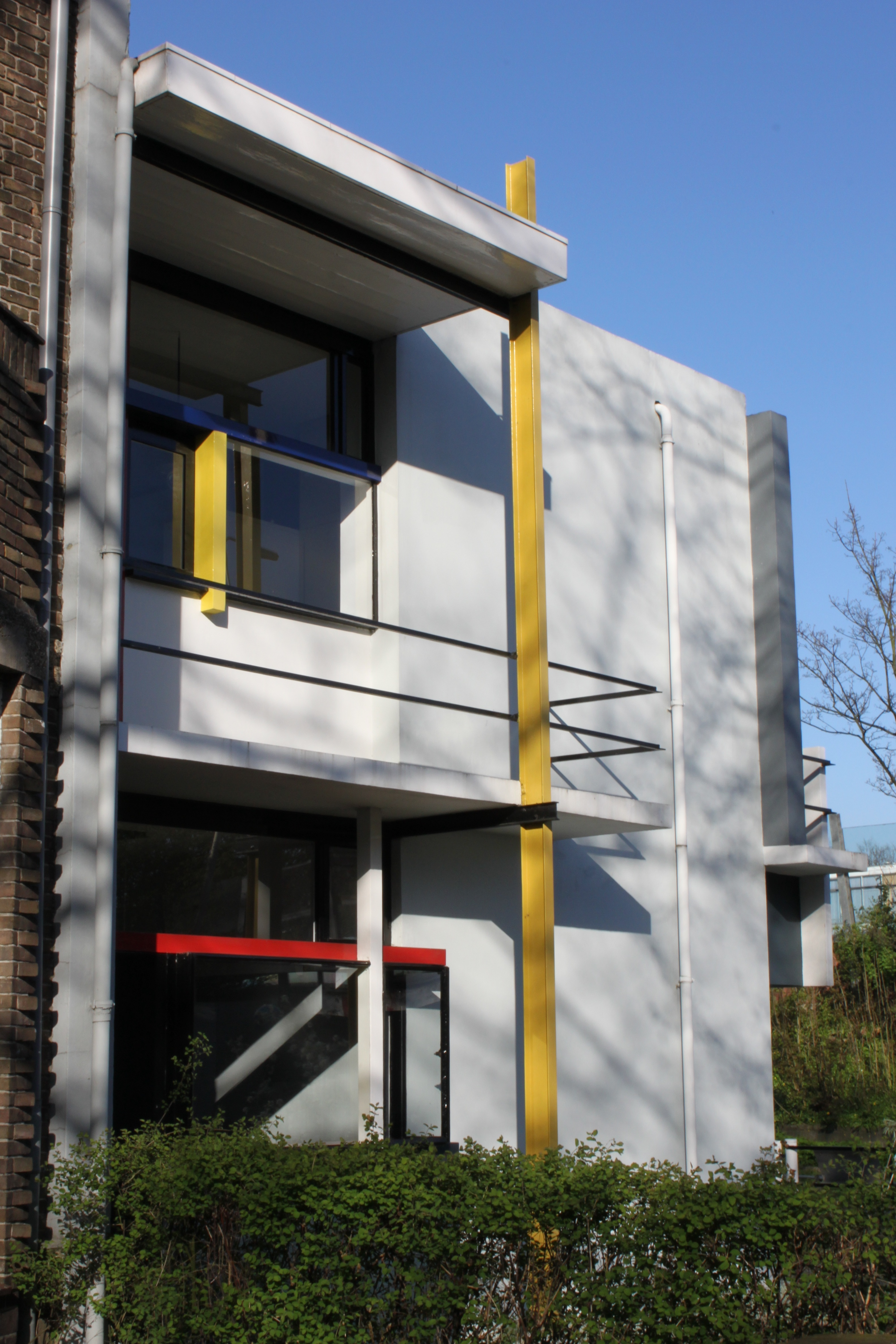

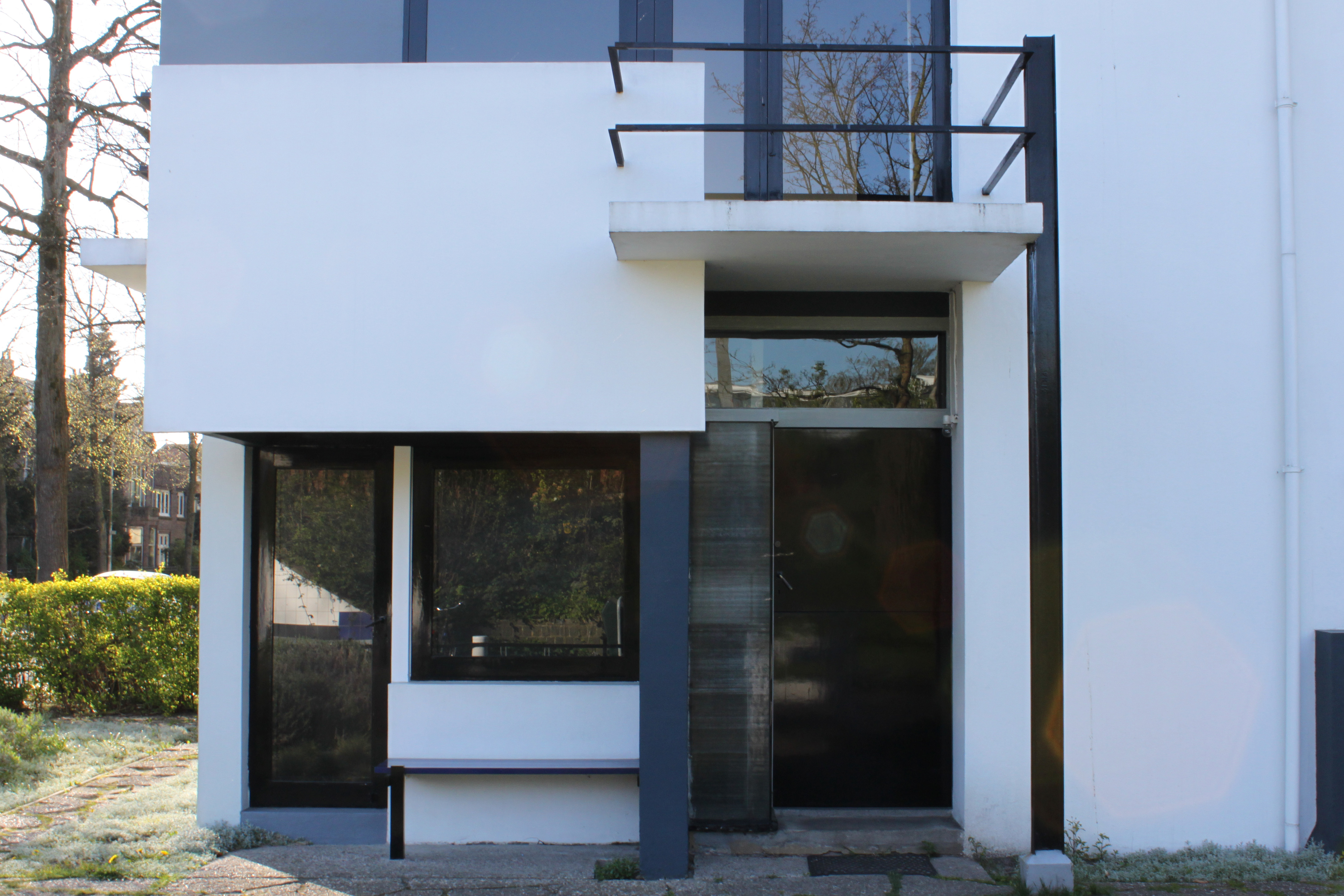

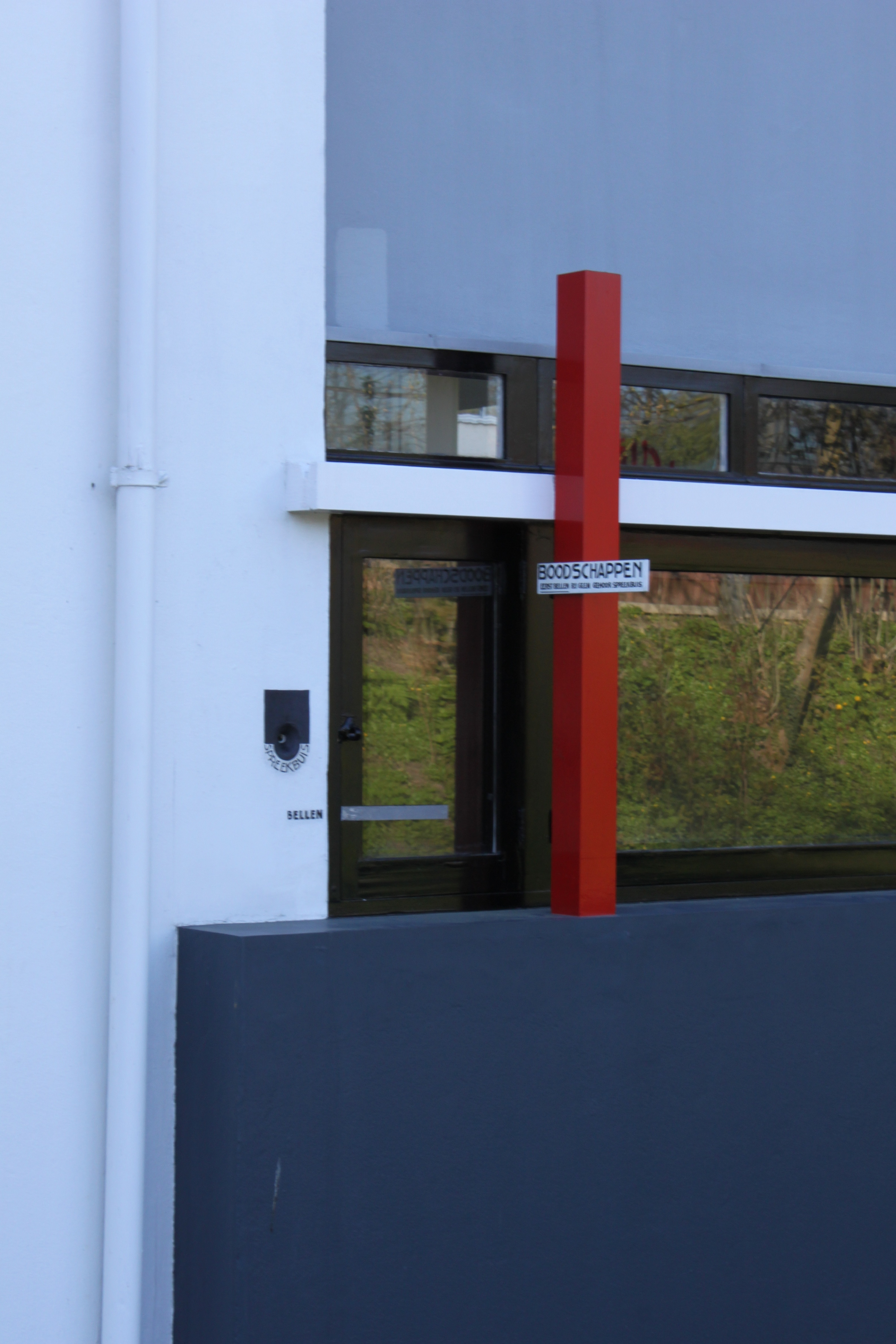

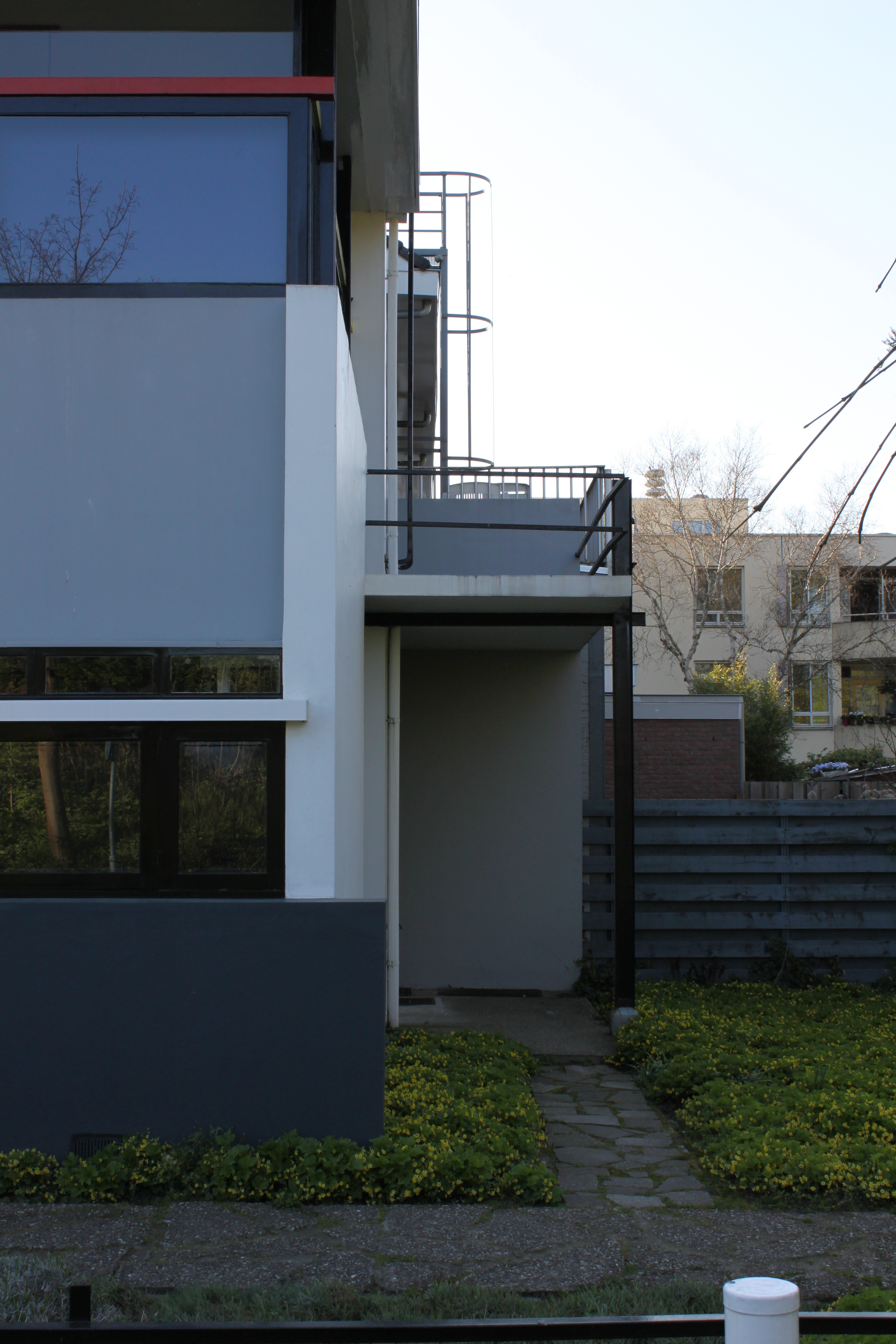

== Sources ==
- "Schröder House." Plans, Sections and Elevations: Key Buildings of the Twentieth Century, by Richard Weston, Laurence King, 2004, pp. 48–49.
- Spurr, David (2016). "The Machine Aesthetic in Joyce and De Stijl". European Joyce Studies. 24. Brill: 7–19. ISSN 0923-9855. JSTOR 44871383.
