= Maison de Bonneterie =

Defunct Dutch fashion department store chain (1889–2014)

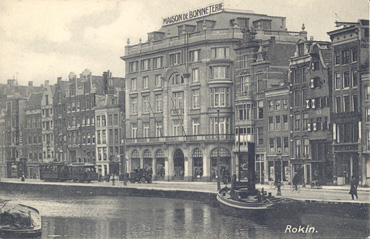
- The Rokin frontage of the Amsterdam store in 1912
- Type: Private (family business)
- Industry: Retail
- Founded: 18 March 1889 in Amsterdam
- Founders: Joseph Cohen; Rosa Cohen-Wittgenstein
- Defunct: 2014
- Fate: Wound up voluntarily; buildings leased to H&M
- Headquarters: Amsterdam, Netherlands
- Products: Clothing, furs, fashion accessories
- Number of employees: c. 100 (2014)

Maison de Bonneterie, usually called De Bonneterie, was a Dutch chain of upmarket fashion department stores, founded in Amsterdam in 1889 and closed in 2014. Its two main stores, on the Kalverstraat and Rokin in Amsterdam and beside the Buitenhof in The Hague, occupy early-20th-century buildings that are listed as rijksmonuments. Smaller branches operated at various times in Amsterdam-Zuid, Rotterdam, Laren and Heemstede.

Joseph Cohen and Rosa Wittgenstein, a German-Jewish couple, opened the business as a small shop selling knitwear and hosiery. By the First World War it sold women's and children's clothing, furs and accessories to a wealthy clientele, and it held a royal warrant from 1901. The founders' relatives ran it until 1941 and again after the war, and family members sat on the board until the company closed. During the German occupation the firm was put under an administrator and its Jewish staff were dismissed; 68 employees of the Amsterdam and The Hague stores were killed. The company announced its closure in February 2014, citing the prolonged recession, and stopped trading later that year without filing for bankruptcy. Both main buildings were then leased to H&M.

== Name ==
Bonneterie is the French word for knitted goods such as stockings, socks, gloves and scarves, and for a shop selling them; the firm's first stock consisted of such goods. The Dutch equivalent is spelt bonnetterie. The company kept the name after it had grown into a general fashion house.

== History ==
=== Founding ===
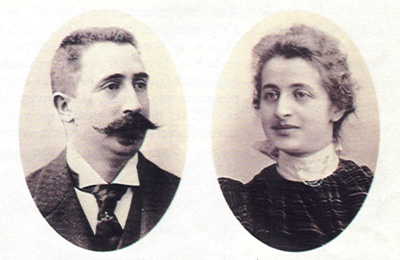
Joseph Cohen and Rosa Wittgenstein, 1888

Joseph Cohen, like his future wife a German Jew, was born in Dinslaken, Germany, on 15 October 1860, the son of Haymann Cohen, a textile merchant, and Sophie Bernard. He travelled in the Netherlands as a representative of the Cologne textile manufacturer L. Heilbron, selling stockings, gloves and knitwear to fashion houses. Noticing that Amsterdam's shops were not particularly well run and faced little competition, he settled in the city in 1887 on his employer's advice. On his rounds he met Rosa (Rosalie) Wittgenstein, born in Warburg on 4 December 1867, (Note: Nieuw Israëlietisch Weekblad gives her year of birth as 1868.) whose parents kept a furniture shop there. She was a saleswoman at the fashion house Hirsch & Cie on the corner of the Leidseplein and the Weteringschans, where her sisters Emma and Selma also later worked; she was related to Sally Berg, one of Hirsch's founders. (Note: The Dutch sources call her Berg's nicht or nichtje, a word that can mean either niece or cousin.) The couple's plan to open a business of their own was not well received by the Hirsch family, whose ambition was the same: a large fashion store in the Paris manner.

With ƒ10,000 in savings, Joseph rented Kalverstraat 181 in 1888, on the corner of the Olieslagerssteeg, which had housed Abraham Canter's menswear shop De Stad Parijs. The couple married, (Note: Ons Amsterdam dates the wedding to February 1888. Joods Amsterdam and the later WinkelStories account, by the same author as the Ons Amsterdam article, place it in Warburg in 1889, shortly before the shop opened. The Algemeen Handelsblad wrote in 1939 that the couple opened the shop in March 1889, just back from their honeymoon.) and the shop opened on 18 March 1889 with three staff: Joseph's niece Bertha Cohen, an apprentice and a bookkeeper. Rosa ran the shop while Joseph continued travelling for a time. Besides knitwear, stockings, gloves and bathing and sports goods, the shop soon added children's clothing, women's coats and suits, and the first ready-made dresses from Paris, and the fur department became well known. Well-to-do women had until then ordered their wardrobes from Paris, Brussels or Berlin, and the Paris department store Grands Magasins du Louvre even held shows at the Hotel des Pays-Bas in Amsterdam; by buying directly from foreign workrooms, the Cohens set out to win these customers.

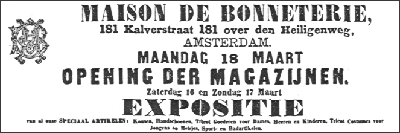
Advertisement for the opening of the shop, 1889

=== Expansion ===
In 1893 the firm took over Kalverstraat 179 and Olieslagerssteeg 6, which the architect A. Jacot joined to the original shop. (Note: Ons Amsterdam mentions only Kalverstraat 179, which it says was rented.) In 1901 it bought Kalverstraat 183, on the opposite corner of the Olieslagerssteeg, which ran through to the Rokin and was one of the largest shop buildings on the street. The building had housed the furniture shop of Vos & Le Grand, and stood on the site of the Kistenmakerspand, where from 1624 the city's chest-makers and joiners had sold their work. In the same year Queen Wilhelmina made the firm a purveyor to the royal household (hofleverancier); her daughter Juliana was later also a customer. The purchase of Rokin 138–148 from 1902 allowed the store to run through from the Kalverstraat to the Rokin.

In 1907 the Cohens commissioned Jacot to design a fashion palace to replace the buildings they had acquired; it was to be the first large store of its kind on the Kalverstraat. (Note: The rijksmonument register and Ons Amsterdam credit Jacot together with W. Oldewelt. According to WinkelStories, the two architects worked together only until 1903, and Oldewelt died in 1906. De Tijd, reporting on the new building in 1909, named both Jacot and Oldewelt as its architects.) The store reopened on 15 March 1909 with twenty display windows and a staff of 150 saleswomen. (Note: Nieuw Israëlietisch Weekblad dates the construction of the store to 1905.) Amsterdam had not seen the display window used in this way before. (Note: DutchNews.nl credits the founders with introducing the shop window concept to the Netherlands as a whole.) By 1914 the Amsterdam store employed 200 people, many of whom stayed for twenty-five years or more, and in 1913 Joseph Cohen had set up a non-contributory pension fund for the staff.

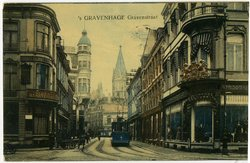
The earlier Hague shop, 1906

The first branch opened in The Hague on 16 March 1896, at Gravenstraat 4, in the former Hotel en Café Belvédère, which Jacot and Oldewelt had converted into a shop. (Note: The Nieuw Israëlietisch Weekblad and the main text of WinkelStories give 1895; the WinkelStories list of branches gives 1896.) In 1913 it moved into a new building at Gravenstraat 2, beside the Buitenhof, commissioned by Joseph Cohen. In Amsterdam the store expanded into Kalverstraat 185–187 in 1927 and Rokin 150 in 1930; all three were sold around 1970. Jacot also designed a villa for the couple near the Vondelpark. (Note: Ons Amsterdam dates the villa to 1912; the Amsterdam Museum dates it to 1913 and says Joseph named it Villa Rosa after his wife. Its address has been given as Koningslaan 12.)

The couple had no children and brought two of Joseph's nephews into the business: Alfred Cohen, Bertha's youngest brother, who arrived in 1905, and Max Cohen, son of Joseph's brother Sally. After Joseph died on 24 March 1924, Alfred and Max took over the management. (Note: Ons Amsterdam and WinkelStories say that Joseph and Rosa withdrew in 1921 and that Alfred and Max took over then. The New York State Holocaust Claims Processing Office gives 1928 for the takeover.) Rosa nevertheless remained the driving force behind the scenes, according to Ons Amsterdam; directors and department heads reported to her at home after their buying trips. (Note: Rosa Cohen-Wittgenstein also lent ƒ375,000 in 1926 to the Amsterdam cooperative building society Eigen Hulp to finance a housing block on the Amsteldijk, and in later years eased its repayments.) In 1933 a lawyer, Paul Herz, son of Rosa's sister Emma, joined the firm.

By 1939 the firm had a regular clientele of about 15,000 customers and employed some 750 people, about 400 of them in Amsterdam. Alfred and Max decided not to hold celebrations for the fiftieth anniversary that year, citing widespread unemployment and political uncertainty. (Note: The Algemeen Handelsblad wrote at the time that the anniversary was kept quiet partly because the founder was no longer alive.) Staff received a bonus, and the firm gave ƒ10,000 to the Amsterdamsch Centraal Comité voor jonge werklozen, a committee for unemployed young people. According to the Amsterdam Museum, Rosa paid ƒ50,000 into the staff pension fund, to which the management added ƒ100,000. The staff presented four stained-glass windows designed by Jan Gregoire. They depict the shops of 1889 and 1901, the opening of The Hague building in 1913 and the Rokin building in 1939, and were placed in the Amsterdam stairwell. Rosa Cohen-Wittgenstein was made a knight of the Order of Orange-Nassau in 1937.

=== Second World War ===
After the German invasion of 1940, businesses with Jewish management had to be registered by 30 November 1940. In March 1941 the occupying authorities seized the business and forced Alfred and Max Cohen out. An Amsterdammer, Herman van de Oudewetering, was appointed Verwalter (administrator), (Note: Joods Amsterdam describes the Verwalter as German.) and the Jewish staff were then dismissed. The occupiers stripped the Amsterdam store, sending textiles to Germany labelled Liebesgaben vom Holländischen Volk ("gifts from the Dutch people"). The building's caretaker, Beyen, moved goods to safety, including furs hidden in the cellars of the Bungehuis, and let male staff wanted for forced labour sleep in the store's workshops. In 1943 the Amsterdam business was moved to a floor of De Bijenkorf, and the Bonneterie building was used as storage by a textile importer.

In January 1942 Rosa Cohen-Wittgenstein, Max Cohen, and Alfred Cohen and his family obtained safe-conduct passes in exchange for paintings by Old Masters, including Jan Steen and Jan van Goyen, from Alfred's collection. (Note: The New York State Holocaust Claims Processing Office describes the collection as confiscated by the Nazis; much of it was recovered after the war.) They travelled to Portugal and on by boat via Cuba to the United States. According to the Amsterdam Museum, the United States at first refused them entry, and Rosa spent a long period in a refugee camp in Cuba, reportedly more than nine months. Her villa in Amsterdam was confiscated by the Dutch SS. Alfred's son Leo was already in the United States on business when the war began; he served in the Dutch army there and changed his surname to Colland.

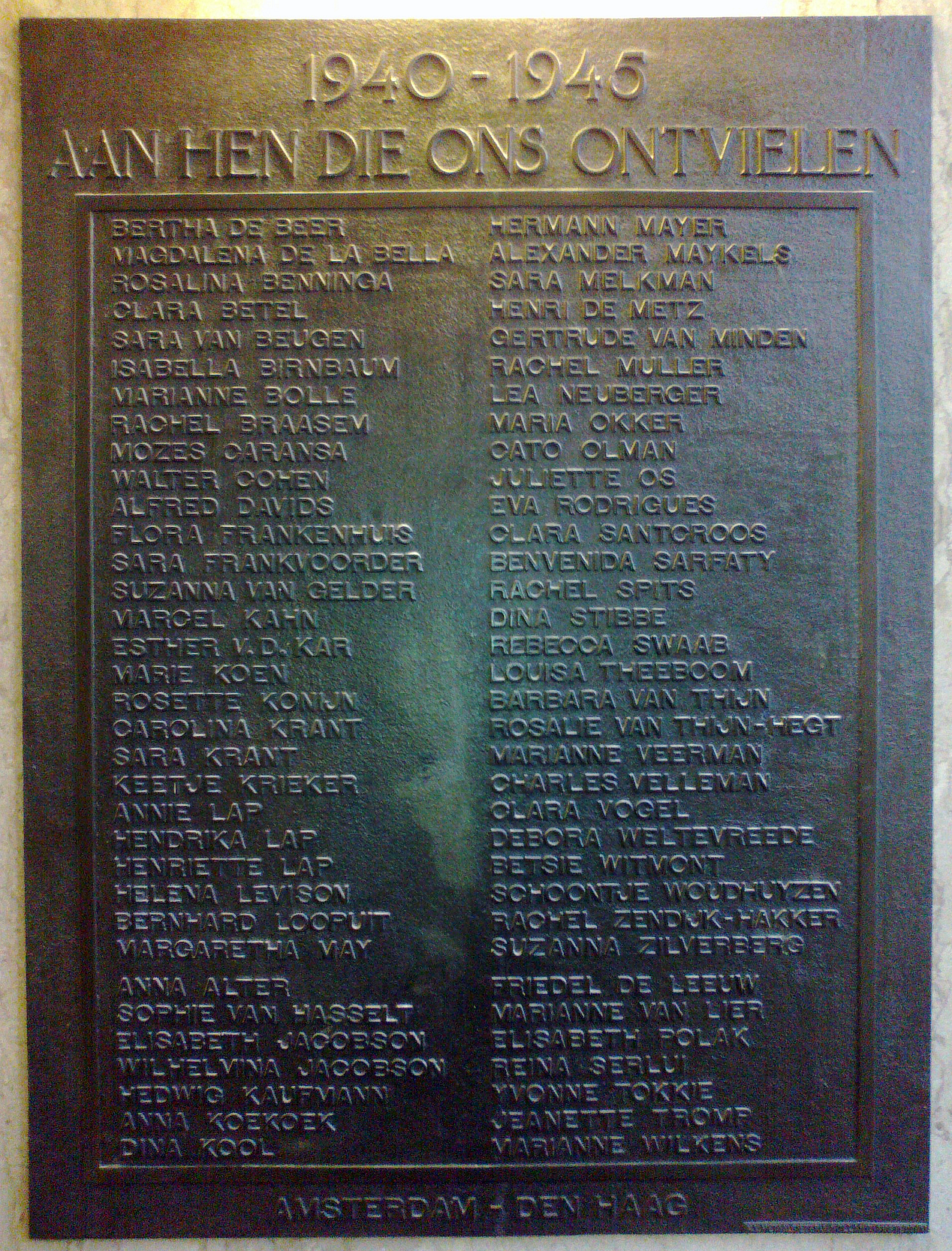
Memorial plaque to the murdered staff in the former Hague store

Sixty-eight Jewish employees of the Amsterdam and The Hague stores were killed. (Note: Ons Amsterdam, WinkelStories, Het Parool (1964) and de Volkskrant (1986) give 66. Nieuw Israëlietisch Weekblad describes the workforce as almost entirely Jewish.) Bronze plaques bearing their names were placed in the stairwells of both stores, and the staff were commemorated in the Amsterdam store every year on 4 May, a practice still continuing in 2014.

=== Post-war period ===
Paul Herz survived the camps and led the rebuilding of the business after the liberation. Rosa returned to Amsterdam, where she was registered again on 5 February 1947, and according to the Amsterdam Museum she reopened the store with her nephew and Alfred's son. She died on 1 November 1949. Alfred and Max stayed in the United States but remained directors, visiting regularly; they died in 1950 and 1951 respectively. When the store held its first sale of textiles without ration coupons in 1949, Het Parool reported that the normally hushed house was as crowded as a pastry shop before Sinterklaas.

In 1951 Herz, who had married Ellen David, a granddaughter of the Hirsch founders Sylvain Kahn and Julie Berg, succeeded Max with half of the shares, and he and Leo Colland took over the management. Colland became the firm's fur specialist, while Herz took charge of women's clothing; another of Alfred's sons, Rolf, went to The Hague store. The first manager from outside the family, David van Dijk, was appointed in 1948 and stayed until 1976. Herz died suddenly on 5 October 1966, aged 59, (Note: Ons Amsterdam gives 27 July 1966.) and Ellen David took his place on the board alongside Leo Colland. At the 75th anniversary in 1964 the staff presented two tile panels by the artist Wijnberg for the Amsterdam stairwell.

=== Modernisation ===
From the 1960s younger customers turned away from what they saw, in Ons Amsterdam's phrase, as a bolwerk van burgerlijke tuttigheid ("bastion of bourgeois stuffiness"). Amsterdam's other large pre-war fashion houses, among them Hirsch, Gerzon, Krause & Vogelzang and Lampe, closed one after another; Maison de Vries followed in 1987 and Nieuw Engeland in 1988. The foundations of the Amsterdam building were also subsiding, and an expensive restoration was needed. After a review by consultants, the firm reorganised under Witteveen, recruited from Krause & Vogelzang, and later Tommy Littaur from De Bijenkorf. About a hundred staff were dismissed, unprofitable workshops and departments were closed, and buying was centralised. New departments for household linen, shoes and perfume were added, together with a brasserie, a golf department and a coffee shop on the Rokin side, and clothes were displayed openly on the shop floor instead of in cabinets. In 1969 the designer Wim Crouwel of Total Design replaced the old window cases with open "Free Space" windows, intended to connect the shop with the street. The anonymous supplier code numbers gave way to designer names such as Dior, Louis Féraud, Guy Laroche and Valentino, and in 1971 the menswear department was extended with sports and leisure clothing. To share the cost of the building, the furniture retailer Pander, founded in 1886, rented the third floor from 1975 to 1985, (Note: When Pander moved in, in March 1975, the Algemeen Dagblad reported that it had taken two floors and shared the ground floor with the Bonneterie.) with the aim of creating a combined home and fashion store; according to WinkelStories, its dark period furniture on the ground floor undermined the attempts at renewal.

Under Littaur the firm opened a branch on the Beethovenstraat in Amsterdam-Zuid on 21 February 1980 and another on the Lijnbaan in Rotterdam on 10 September 1981, as the start of a chain of smaller shops. The Rotterdam branch closed in 1989 and the Beethovenstraat branch in 1992. (Note: WinkelStories dates the two branches to 1978–1992 and 1979–1989.) In 1982 Littaur left, and Leo's son Jim Colland, who had worked at the Zurich department store Globus, and Willem (Wim) Koster, Herz's son-in-law, from De Bijenkorf, took over the management, while Herz's daughter Mariette took charge of buying women's clothing. (Note: WinkelStories dates the handover to December 1985.) According to WinkelStories, the store was the first in the Netherlands to open separate in-store shops for Polo Ralph Lauren and Tommy Hilfiger.

An auction of theatre costumes held in the Amsterdam store, 1987

The centenary in 1989 was marked with a party and a culinary fashion show at Kasteel Oud-Wassenaar. Eight artists, including Herman Brood, were commissioned to make lithographs on the theme "Jubileum", with part of the proceeds going to UNICEF, and the writer Marjan Berk wrote a commissioned story, Glinsteringen, set in the store. The grey carrier bags with black lettering, designed by Dior, were replaced by a bag with a specially designed crest bearing the motto Semper Qualitas Centanni. At that time the firm was still owned by the founders' family, with the fourth generation on the board.

=== Decline and closure ===
From 1998 the company had two shops in Laren, De Bonneterie for Men and De Bonneterie for Women. A branch in Heemstede, designed by the store's regular interior designer Sherrie Zwail, opened on 27 September 2007. In 2009 the firm switched entirely to shop-in-shops for higher-priced brands. The Amsterdam interior was rebuilt to a design by the English architect Charles Dunett and reopened on 17 September 2009, the firm's 120th anniversary; in June 2009 the Heemstede branch had become an outlet store. In 2011 the two Laren shops were sold to the fashion company McGregor, leaving the Amsterdam and The Hague stores and the outlet. Jim Colland left the management in 2010 and Koster in 2012; Edwin Boer then ran the firm until September 2013, when Patrick van der Borden became general director. (Note: FashionUnited reported in June 2013 that Boer would leave at the end of that month.) In November 2013 the firm put an online shop live as part of a multichannel strategy, intending to launch it formally at the 125th anniversary.

On 21 February 2014, a month before its 125th anniversary, the company announced that it would close. A spokesperson said that, after reviewing options with the bank and shareholders, the board had concluded that continuing was no longer economically responsible because of the prolonged recession. The company did not file for bankruptcy, and redundancy for its 100 staff was applied for with effect from 1 September. A saleswoman with eighteen years' service described the mood among staff to the Nieuw Israëlietisch Weekblad as grief, dismay and astonishment, and compared the closure with that of Metz & Co the previous year. The stores closed in the late summer of 2014. (Note: Joods Amsterdam gives August 2014 and WinkelStories September 2014. The closing date has also been given as 24 August 2014.)

== Merchandise and clientele ==
The store was aimed at well-to-do families, many of whom shopped there for generations. Unlike Hirsch, which sold only made-to-measure clothing, De Bonneterie concentrated on high-quality ready-to-wear. Its owners deliberately kept the threshold high so that regular customers would not mix with the lower classes; passers-by did not simply wander in. At the 1909 reopening the ground floor held small departments for hosiery, gloves, scarves, handkerchiefs, petticoats, bags, hats and English-style boys' clothing, with coats and dresses on the floors above; the fur and evening-wear departments were particularly large. For children the store specialised in English fashions, notably sailor suits. Garments were kept in cabinets rather than on display, and customers were shown pieces by a saleswoman in one of 32 fitting rooms. Each department had its own alterations workshop, which could fit new sleeves or a new back to a dress, and customers could return each season to have clothes refitted; hats, gloves and furs were cleaned in a separate steam room.

Before the war the buyers looked mainly to Vienna, Berlin and Paris. In 1933 they travelled to America for the first time, bringing back dresses from New York, stockings from Canada, brassieres from Hollywood and the first costume jewellery. (Note: Ons Amsterdam says the store turned to American fashion from the late 1920s. In 1939 the firm told the Algemeen Handelsblad that it bought dresses in New York, stockings in Canada and brassieres in Hollywood.) Every garment carried the Maison de Bonneterie label; the names of manufacturers were kept secret, and staff knew them only by number. One of these suppliers, the Berlin coat maker Max Haar, fled to the Netherlands with his family in 1938 and continued to supply the store from Amsterdam with his daughter Ruth. Department heads (cheffins) did their own buying and kept books recording each regular customer's purchases, and saleswomen were paid partly on commission and fined for breaches of discipline. From around 1920 the firm sent salespeople with complete collections to hotels in provincial towns, and delivered goods on approval free of charge throughout the country. In 1989 Wim Koster claimed that the store had been the first in the Netherlands to sell Lacoste shirts and American jeans after the war.

== Branches ==
Besides its two main stores in Amsterdam and The Hague, the firm opened several smaller branches from 1980 onwards. All had closed by the time the chain shut down in 2014.

Maison de Bonneterie stores
Location	Address	Opened	Closed	Notes
Amsterdam	Kalverstraat 181 (1889–1909); Kalverstraat 183 / Rokin 140 (from 1909)	18 March 1889	2014	Original shop, expanded into neighbouring buildings; the present store opened on 15 March 1909. Rijksmonument; leased to H&M after the closure.
The Hague	Gravenstraat 4 (1896–1913); Gravenstraat 2, at the Buitenhof (from 1913)	16 March 1896	2014	First branch, in the former Hotel en Café Belvédère. Moved in 1913 to a purpose-built store, now a rijksmonument; leased to H&M after the closure.
Amsterdam-Zuid	Beethovenstraat 32	21 February 1980	1992	Opened as a trial for a chain of smaller shops.
Rotterdam	Lijnbaan 83	10 September 1981	1989	In the former Zumpolle shop. Closed because of poor trading.
Laren	Nieuweweg 6c–6d	1998	2011	De Bonneterie for Men. Sold to McGregor in 2011.
Laren	Zevenend 1–5	1998	2011	De Bonneterie for Women. Sold to McGregor in 2011.
Heemstede	Binnenweg 7–9	27 September 2007	2014	Full branch until June 2009, then an outlet store until the chain closed. (Note: The outlet's closure has been dated to 31 July 2014.)

== Buildings ==
=== Amsterdam ===
Stairwell and lift, Kalverstraat 183, c. 1920

The Amsterdam store is at Kalverstraat 183 and Rokin 140. The Rokin frontage, in Oberkirchner sandstone, is in the traditionalist style then emerging in the Netherlands, which drew on 17th- and 18th-century architecture, and is crowned by a balustrade, with a balcony over the framed entrance bay. The existing building at Kalverstraat 183 was retained. A central section linked it to the new five-storey Rokin building and contained a stained-glass dome, three galleries, two broad staircases and two lifts. The two upper floors on the Rokin side held offices and workshops. The original interior was in Louis XVI style, with crystal chandeliers and many mirrors. Three hundred crystal lamps lit the galleries and windows, powered by the store's own 28-horsepower steam engine at a time when most Amsterdam homes still used gas light, and the lift was fitted with cut mirror glass and velvet seats by the Milan firm Stigler. The staircases and lift remained largely unchanged into the 21st century. The building was listed as a rijksmonument on 9 July 1974, both for its façades and for the surviving interior: the stained-glass domes, the galleries and the crystal chandeliers.

=== The Hague ===
The Hague store from the Gravenstraat

The Hague store, completed in 1913, stands on its own plot bounded by the Gravenstraat, Buitenhof, Halstraat and Dagelijkse Groenmarkt. It was designed by A. Jacot with A. H. Zinsmeister, J. L. Crouwel and G. F. la Croix in the historicist Um 1800 style. (Note: Ons Amsterdam, WinkelStories and de Volkskrant attribute the design to Jacot and Oldewelt.) It has classicist natural-stone façades, four storeys under a slate roof and a large stained-glass skylight, and its sculpture and ornament show the influence of Javanese art. It was listed as a rijksmonument on 19 October 1993. The main entrance is on the corner of the Gravenstraat and the Buitenhof, and the letting agent CBRE gave its floor space as about 4,500 square metres (48,000 sq ft) over six floors.

== Later use of the buildings ==
After the closure the property company Maison de Bonneterie Onroerend Goed B.V. let both buildings to H&M on a long-term lease, with flagship stores planned for autumn 2015. The Amsterdam store reopened after a refurbishment in November 2021 as an H&M concept store offering clothing rental and repair.

== In museums ==
Original display cases from the store were shown in the Amsterdams Historisch Museum's exhibition Modepaleizen 1880–1960 on Amsterdam's luxury fashion houses. One of the large glass cases made for the store around 1900 by the London firm F. Sage & Co. is in the Rijksmuseum. The house was also represented in Maison Amsterdam, an exhibition held in the Nieuwe Kerk with the Amsterdam Museum from September 2021 to April 2022. Bonneterie garments and accessories are held in Dutch museum collections, including a pair of gloves from 1920–1940 in the Amsterdam Museum.

== Gallery ==
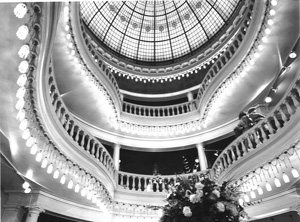
Interior of the Amsterdam store after the 1909 rebuilding

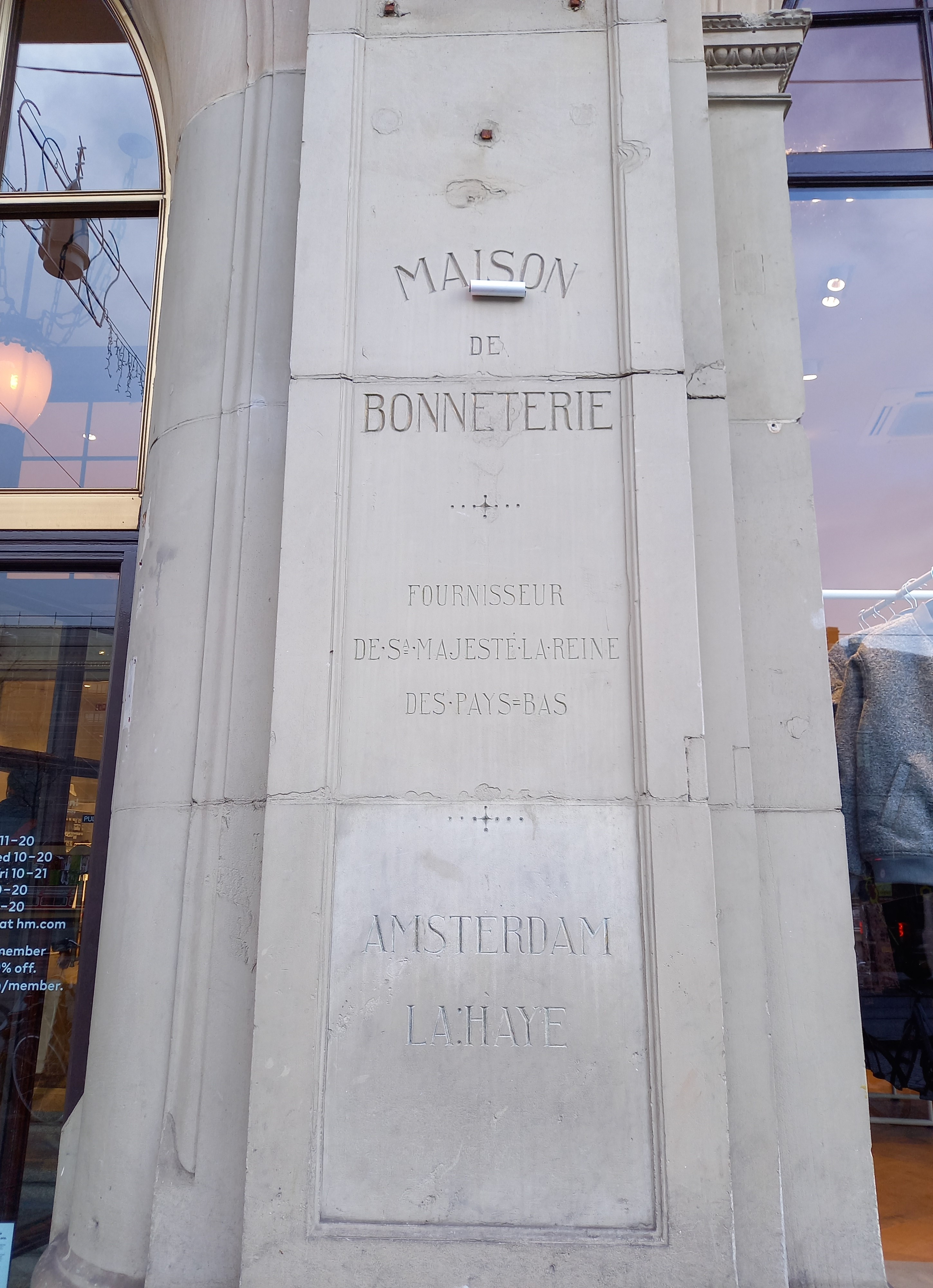
The store's name on the Rokin façade, 2023

Amsterdam interior, 1977

Kalverstraat decorated for the inauguration of Queen Juliana, 1948

Stained-glass skylight in The Hague store

Sculpted façade in The Hague

The Hague store, 2011

Royal-warrant sign in The Hague, 2018

Glove stamped with the store's name, c. 1950–1970 (Rijksmuseum)

Women's winter coat with the store's label, 1961–1965 (Museum Rotterdam)
