= PC Hoofthuis =

University of Amsterdam building

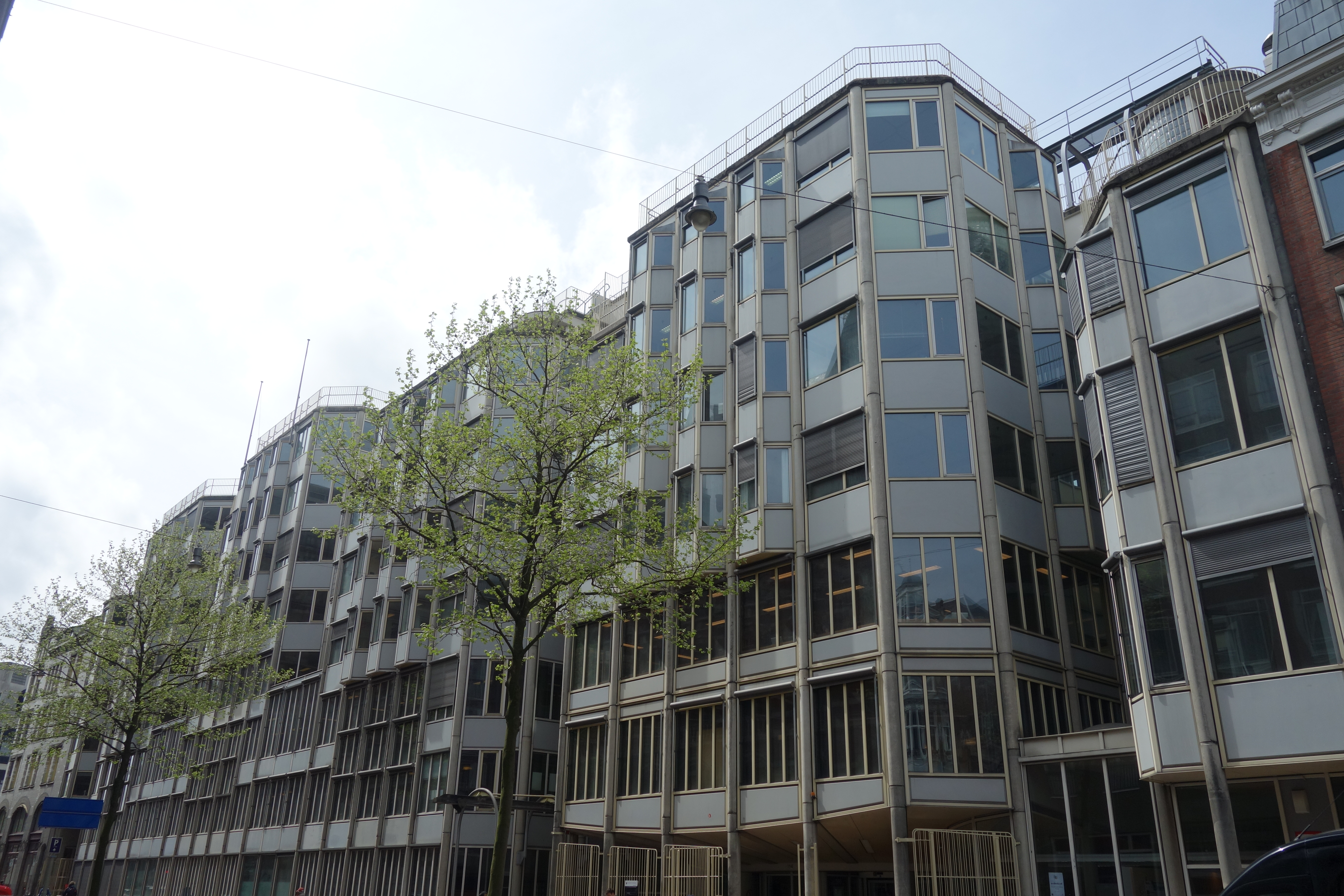
PCHoofthuis2018-9

The PC Hoofthuis is an educational building of the University of Amsterdam in central Amsterdam, Netherlands. Built between 1976 and 1983, it is considered one of the primary works of the Dutch architect Theo Bosch, completed in association with Aldo Van Eyck. It currently houses lecture halls for the Faculty of Humanities, much like the historic Bungehuis building down the street on the Spuistraat. It is named after the historian, poet and playwright Pieter Corneliszoon Hooft (1581-1647), because the former home In den Huypot of the Hooft family stood at this location.

== History and design ==
Until 1979, the site of the PC Hoofthuis was occupied by the former Twentsche Bank, built in 1874, which merged in 1964 with the Algemene Bank Nederland. Van Eyck and Bosch worked on the building together until they dissolved their partnership under design disagreements in 1982; Bosch subsequently finished the building the next year alone.

Among students, the building is popularly nicknamed “Het huis van de kobolden” (The home of the goblins).

The building is controversial. Enthusiasts insist that it is open and accessible, while others have reputedly called it “the ugliest building on the street.” The interior is striking for its open original plan. Lecture rooms sit on either side of the corridors and are separated from the hallways by a glass wall, which makes them easy to see into. In fact, the glass partitions between the lecture halls and corridors did not exist originally, as the intention was that one could catch various fragments of lectures while walking down the corridors and decide whether one wanted to keep listening. This scheme was abandoned when it became apparent that the lectures would be disturbed by the noise in the corridors, which must have also made it more difficult for the audience to hear the lecture.

Lecture halls are located on the first to the seventh floors and the offices of various departments are also located in the building. The first and second floors also contain a portion of the Arts Library, which a study center is located on the ground floor and the third floor contains a canteen. In the basement is a bicycle storage and fitness center.

As part of the University of Amsterdam protests in the fall of 2018, on 28 September the PC Hoofthuis was occupied by students.

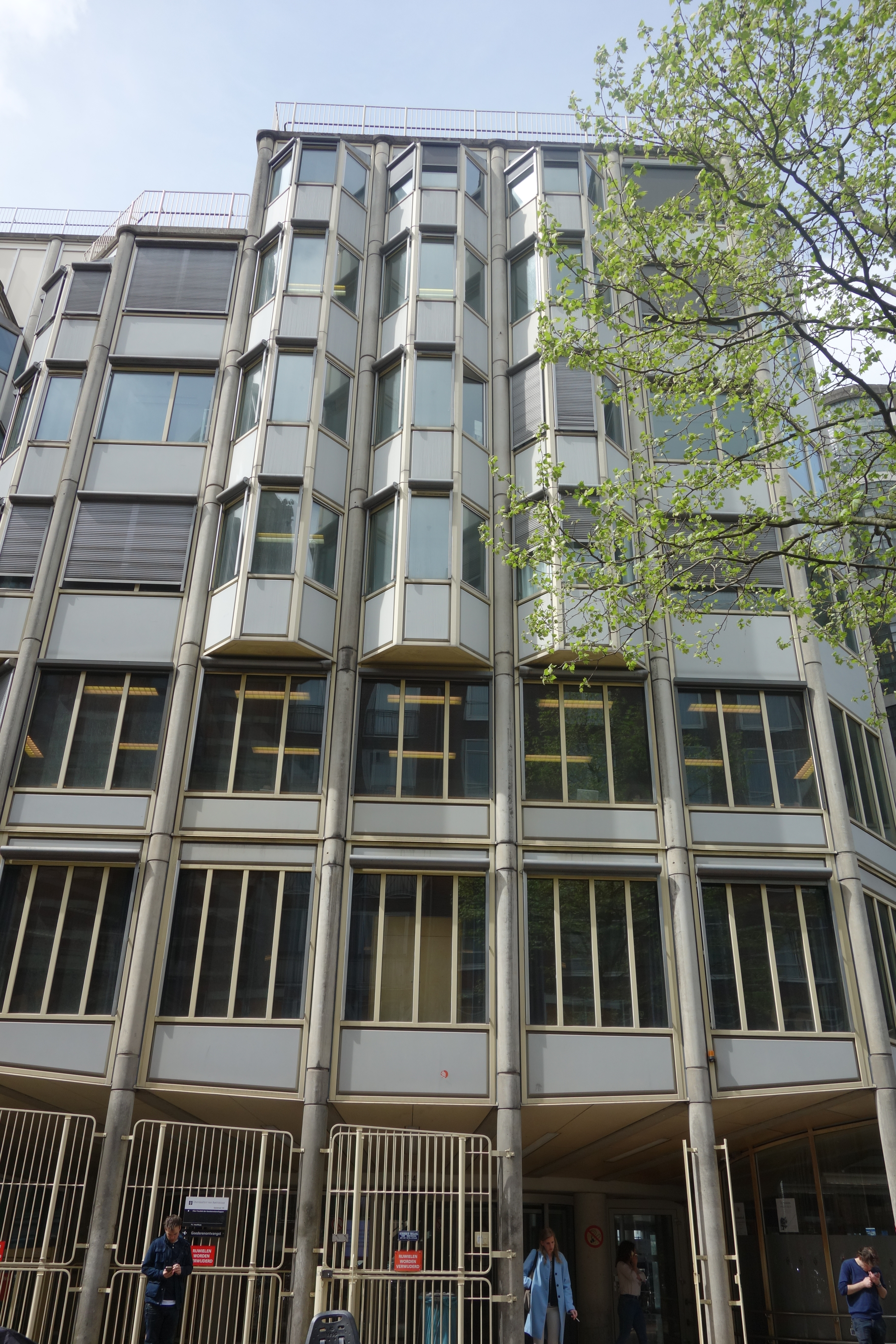

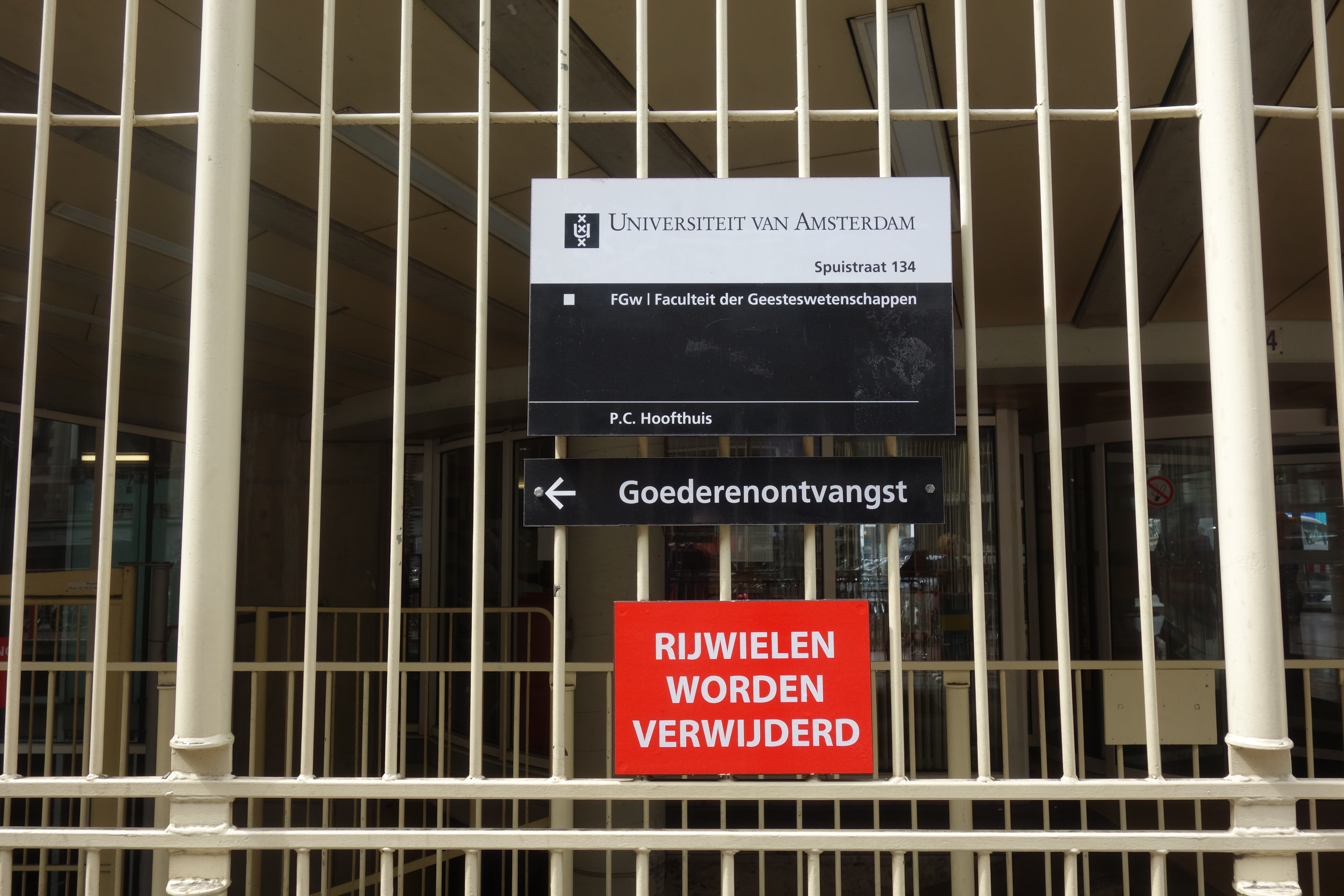

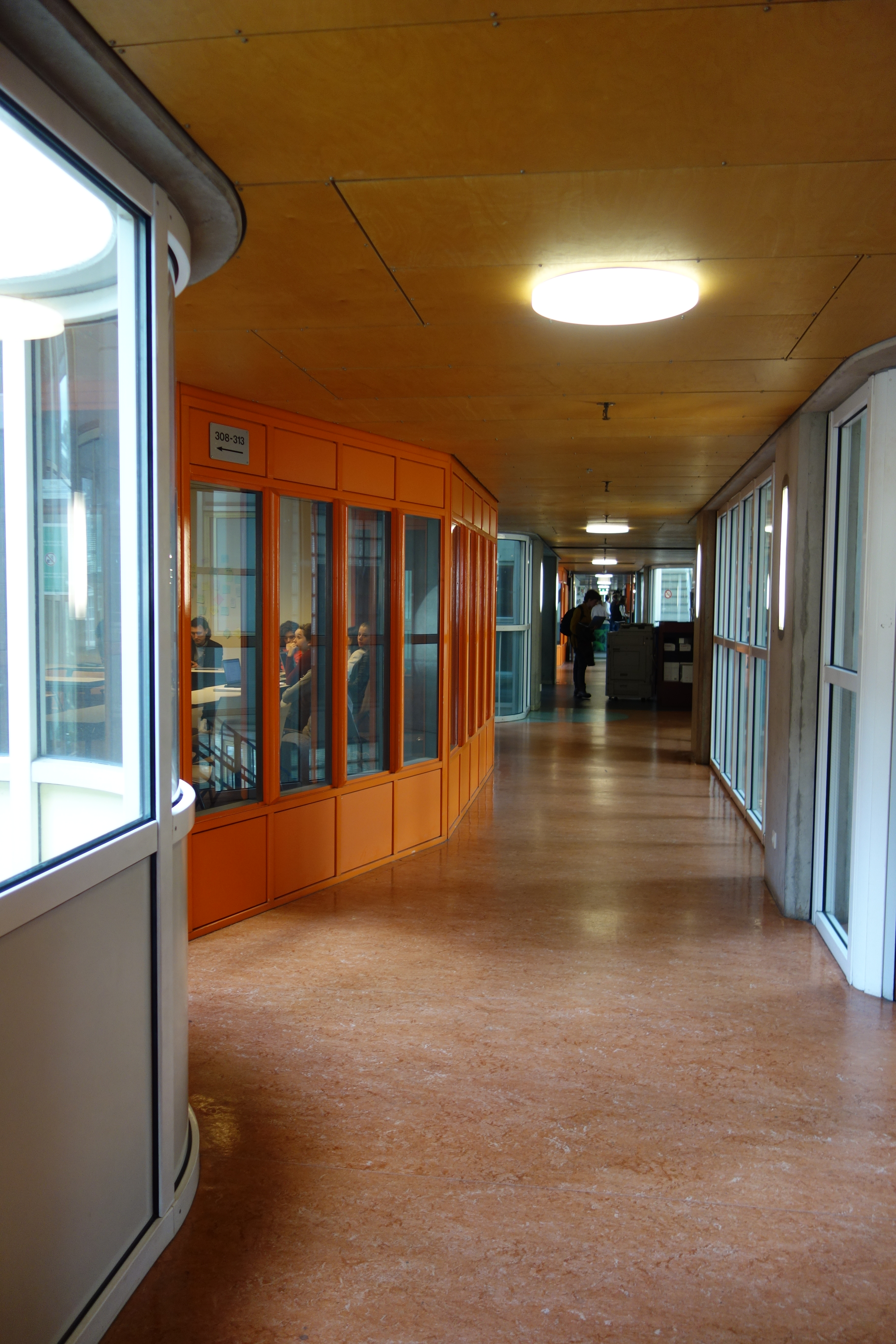

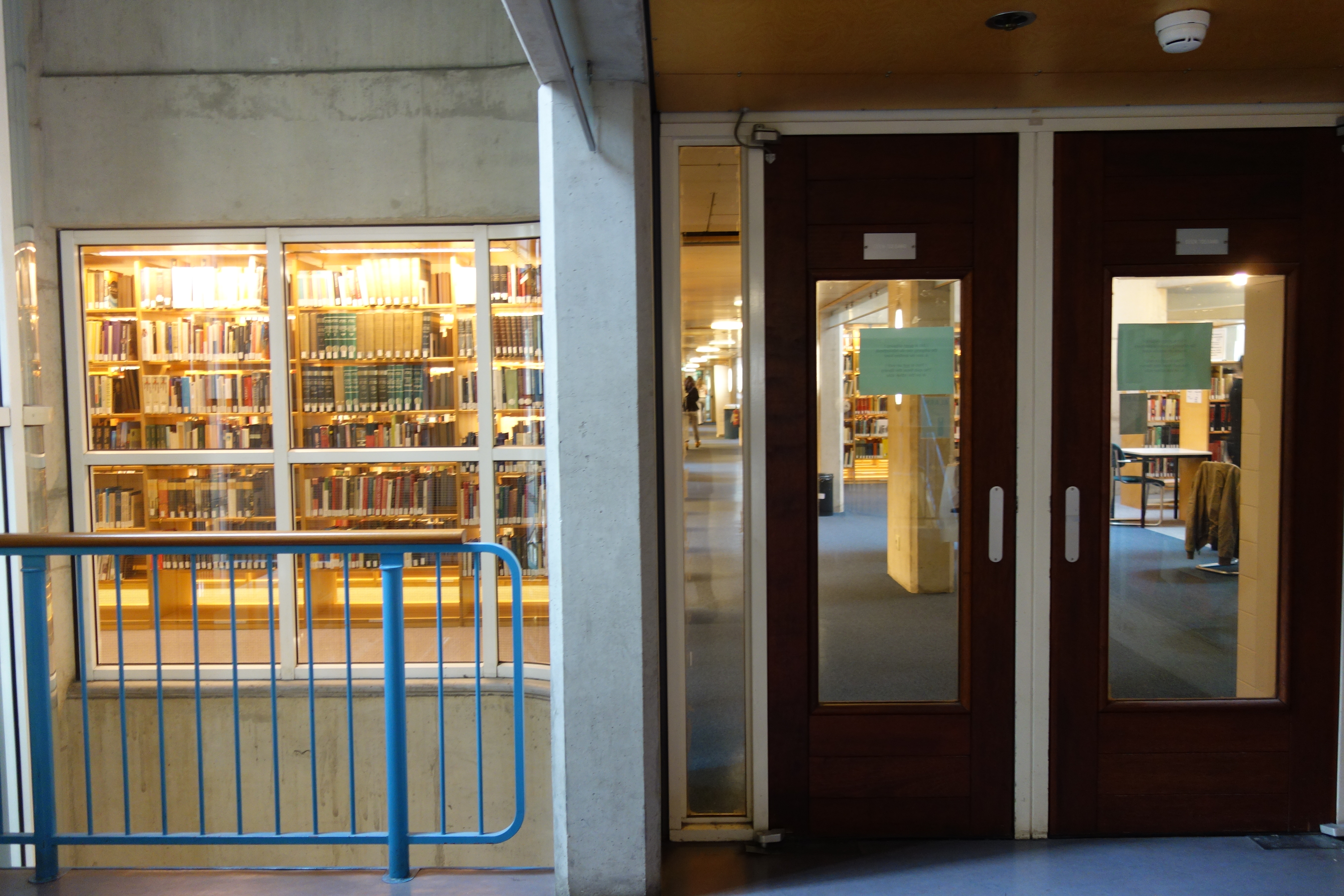

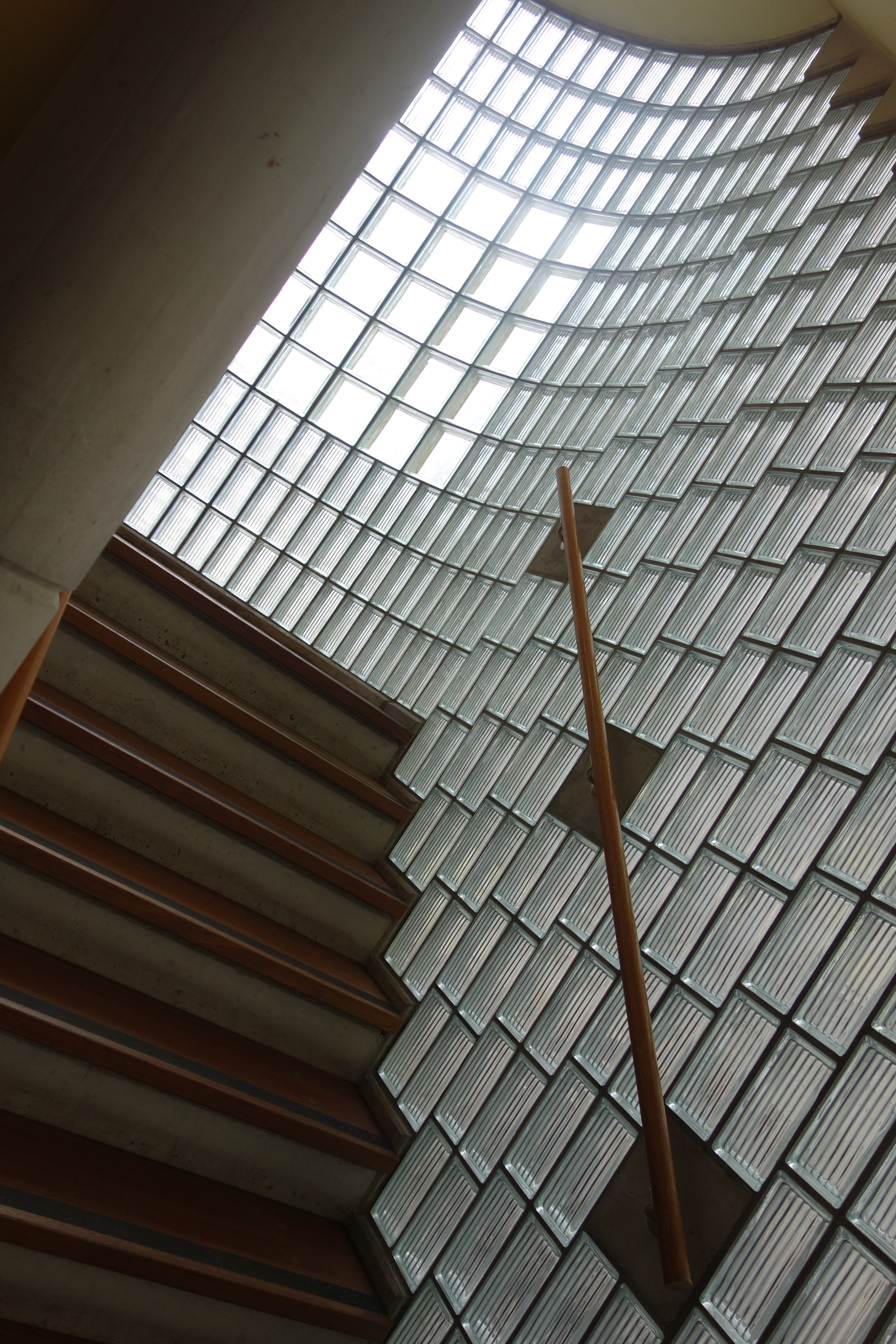
