= Bungehuis and Maagdenhuis occupations =

Student protest occupations in the Netherlands

The Bungehuis and Maagdenhuis occupations were part of a protest occupation movement by a group of students and staff-members at the University of Amsterdam (UvA) who first occupied the Bungehuis Building, and then the Maagdenhuis Building, the administrative center of UvA. The occupiers referred to themselves as The New University (for a democratic university). The Bungehuis occupation lasted 11 days, from February 13 to February 24, 2015, and the Maagdenhuis occupation began on the evening of February 25, 2015 and lasted until April 11.

== Background ==
Beginning in November 2014, UvA announced planned cuts in programs in the face of budget issues. In the proposed restructuring, called "Profiel 2016" (Profile 2016), the School of Humanities was especially hard hit, with resources being focused on career-oriented majors. In early February 2015, Dutch newspaper Het Parool reported that UvA would be eliminating several degree programs in the Humanities faculty. Chief among the programs to be eliminated were various degree-level programs in individual modern languages. The university was also considering the consolidation of all remaining individual degree programs in Humanities (such as Philosophy, History, Dutch Literature and English Literature) into a single "Liberal Arts" degree program. University Dean Frank van Vree argued that the cuts were necessitated by falling student enrollment in recent years, calling for a "rigorous reorganization" of the Humanities faculty.

In reaction to these ongoing developments, a student protest movement began in late 2014. The Humanities Rally group formed, composed of students and faculty members, and began a campaign of demonstrations and petitions to protest the announced changes.

== Bungehuis occupation ==
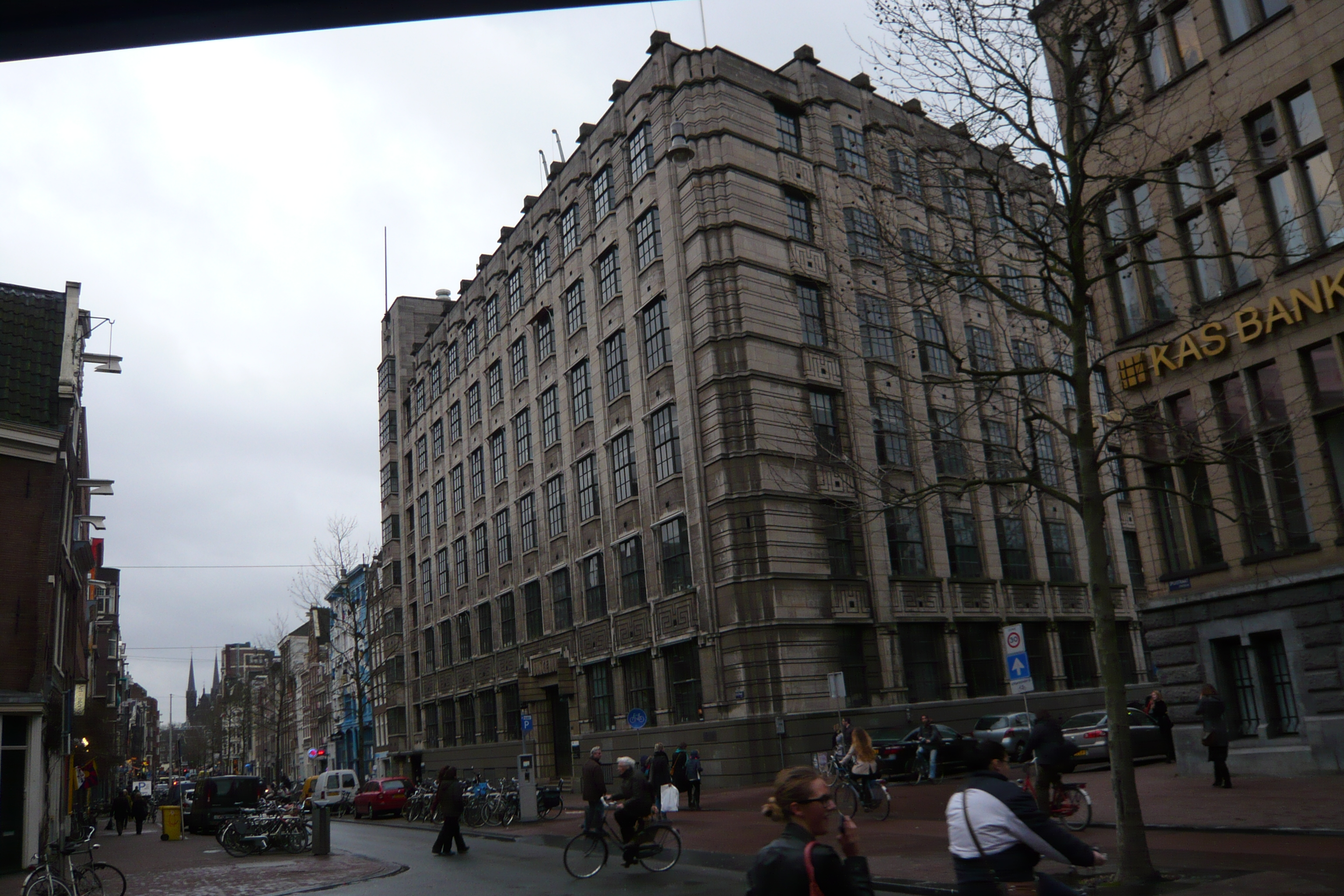
Bungehuis in 2011

On 4 February 2015, Het Parool published the leaked contents of the university's outline of Profiel 2016, the proposed roadmap to implement the austerity programs that had been discussed in the preceding months. Master's degree courses with fewer than 20 students would be eliminated, and only three PhD students would be supported at any given time. In reaction to this information, which was perceived as a complete rejection of the demands of the Humanities Rally protesters, dozens of students and staff-members under the name The New University and who were not necessarily affiliated with Humanities Rally, occupied the Bungehuis, the home of the Humanities Faculty at UvA, on the morning of 13 February 2015.

The group's demands included:

1. Democratic election of the university board
2. Change of the allocation model: finance based on input, not on efficiency
3. Cancellation of the current Profiel 2016
4. Referendums per institute and programme about collaboration between the UvA and the VU at the FNWI (Department of the Sciences)
5. Fixed contracts instead of flexible staff appointments
6. An open debate about housing costs in relation to budget cuts of research and education and a cessation of real estate speculation (including a halt to the proposed sale of the Bungehuis building)

The occupiers stated that their intention was not to disrupt education, but rather to send a message to the University Board of Directors (the College van Bestuur or CvB). To that end, they prepared a schedule of alternate locations for all classes that were disrupted by the occupation. A group of PhD students did not believe this was done adequately. While making clear they supported the call for a democratic and autonomous university, they voiced their opposition to the occupation in a petition, citing the inhibiting of research due to it, caused by for example restricted access to the baby-lab. The occupiers called for open dialogue with the CvB to discuss the Profiel 2016 plans, but the CvB refused, instead instigating legal action to remove the protesters, partly motivated by the claims that research was being impeded by the occupation. The CvB initiated a lawsuit seeking a fine of €100,000 per day until the protesters vacated the building. The demand for such a high fine was seen as "heavy handed" by many faculty and staff of the university. Instead, the court ordered the protesters to pay €1,000 per day, up to a maximum of €25,000.

The occupation received significant support from within the UvA, staff, members of Parliament, public figures such as Freek de Jonge, and trade unions. A petition in support of the occupiers on the social media website Change.org has garnered over 7000 signatures, with signatories including Noam Chomsky, Jacques Rancière, Judith Butler, Axel Honneth, Simon Critchley, Jean-Luc Nancy, Saskia Sassen, James Tully and Johan Galtung.

== Resolution ==
On 23 February, the protesters and the CvB, mediated by Amsterdam mayor Eberhard van der Laan, sat down to negotiate an end to the occupation. The talks continued throughout the next day, but by the end of the day on 24 February, the negotiations failed to produce a resolution acceptable to both sides. The CvB believed their proposal for a 'festival of the sciences' to discuss the proposed cuts with students, staff, the minister of education and parliamentarians was a sufficient concession, while the occupiers objected that the outcome of the festival was non-binding and hence was not a sufficient concession on the part of the CvB.

In light of the failure of negotiations, police were sent in to remove the protesters, with a total of 46 occupiers and protesters on the street outside the building being arrested.

== Outcome of Bungehuis occupation ==
Even before the occupation, the various protests had resulted in the university's abandonment of Profiel 2016 as it was presented in November 2014. However, the New University members did not feel that the CvB's adjustment was sufficient given the leaked revised roadmap in early February. As of February 2015, no further changes have been announced based on the resolution of the occupation. One day after the eviction, de Volkskrant reported that the university would go ahead with its sale of the Bungehuis to a private firm which is planning on turning it into a British private society club, contravening yet another of The New University's demands.

== Maagdenhuis occupation ==
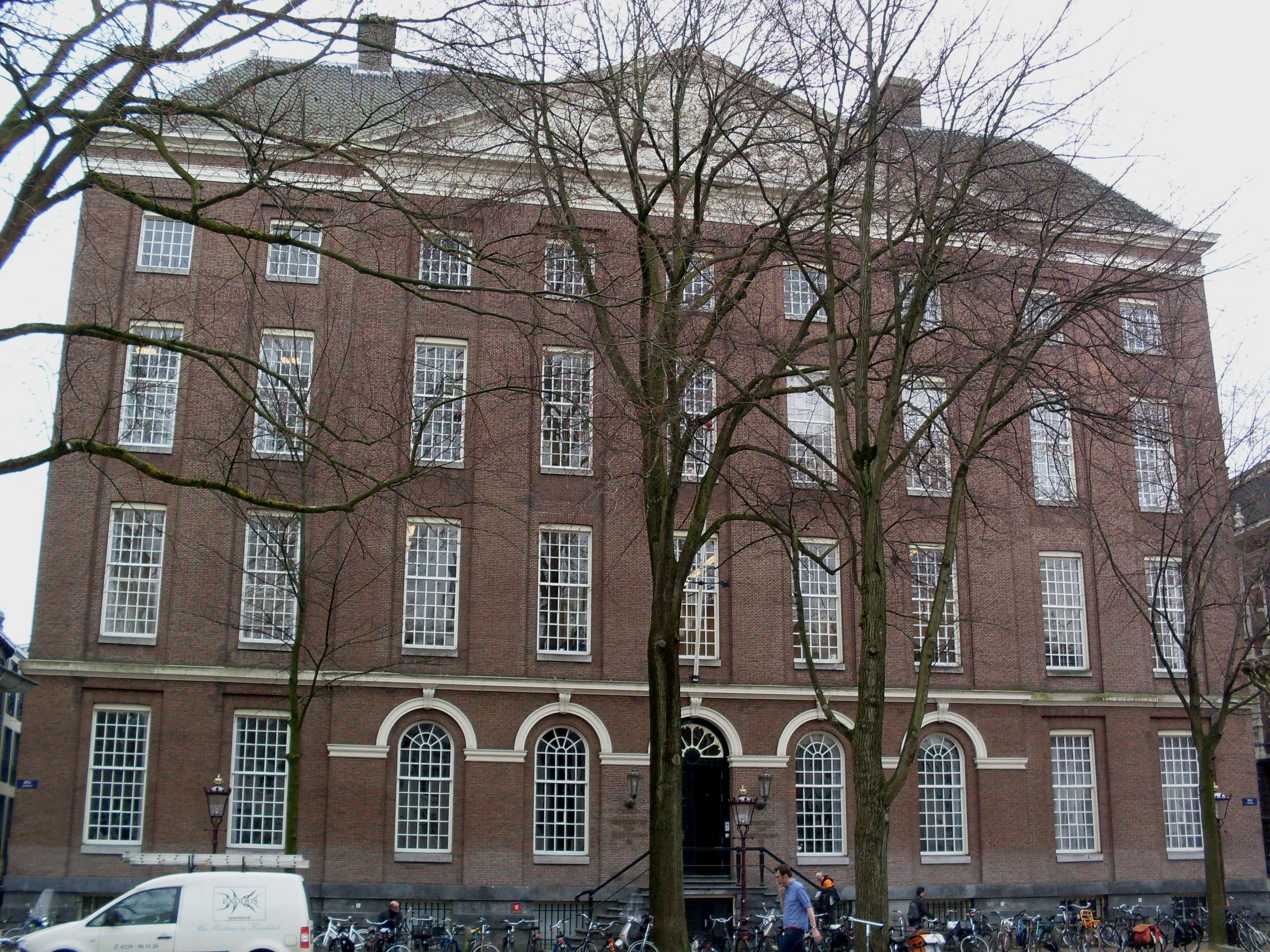
Maagdenhuis in 2013

On Wednesday February 25, the day after the police eviction, various student organizations and unions organized a demonstration in support of The New University's demands, with the NOS reporting more than a thousand demonstrators present, the largest yet in opposition to the CvB's plans. At the end of the demonstration, a group of protesters forced the door of the Maagdenhuis, the main administrative building of the UvA, and occupied it, raising once again the demands of The New University.

The next day, on Thursday February 26, the CvB offered some concessions to put an end to the occupation. These concessions were as follows: Making available more funding for additional studies like a 'liberal arts college', postponing the planned defunding of the individual modern languages for two more years in order to give them the chance to prove that they are financially viable, and adding a student-member to the University Board of Directors (CvB). The occupiers rejected these concessions as being insufficient in addressing their grievances and are continuing their occupation of the Maagdenhuis. The following day The New University announced plans to extend their movement to other universities in the country. On Wednesday March 4 The New University called for a national day of action in which New University sections in the universities of Leiden, Groningen, Utrecht, Nijmegen and Rotterdam participated. Several "HBO" vocational university student organizations also announced their support for The New University movement, and expressed their willingness to participate in working toward realizing its aims of expanding democratization and transparency in their communities as well.

On the same day a group of teachers and other staff organized themselves under the name "RethinkUvA" in support of The New University movement. They demanded to take actions such as striking and occupying UvA buildings if the CvB does not appropriately reply to their demands, which strongly overlap with those raised by The New University. They include the abandonment of Profiel 2016, democratic election of members of the UvA administration who are able to take binding actions such as the CvB and the deans and a call for an independent investigation of the financial situation at the UvA. The NOS reported on Thursday March 8 that the FNV federation of trade unions of the Netherlands has come out in support of the protest movement. The demands of RethinkUvA would be taken over and submitted to the various university councils. If they are not satisfactorily replied to, actions such as strikes might follow, said the FNV chairman.

RethinkUvA originally set a deadline for a response to their demands on Friday March 6 but upon the request of the CvB for more time the deadline was extended to Monday March 9 9:00. When the CvB failed to meet that deadline and asked for more time, RethinkUvA gave up their trust in the CvB and called for it to step down on Tuesday March 9. The following day de Volkskrant reported that the CvB had given concessions to students and staff involved in or supporting the aims of the Maagdenhuis occupiers: The New University, RethinkUvA and Humanities Rally. These were laid down in ten points indicating the intention to move toward increased democratization and transparency in the university. A joined General Assembly meeting of the various protest groups was organized at the occupied Maagdenhuis the next day to formulate a response to the CvB's concessions. While it was seen as a welcome development, they deemed the CvB's concessions to be insufficient, noticed the lack of any concrete proposals, and decided to continue the occupation of the Maagdenhuis.

== Maagdenhuis eviction ==
On Saturday April 11, 2015, the Maagdenhuis was evicted by police. There were eleven arrests and a police officer was wounded. The University of Amsterdam Executive Board (CvB) issued a statement in which it stated "we regret the events that transpired this past Saturday."

One week later, Louise Gunning (the chair of the CvB) resigned.

== Outcome of Maagdenhuis eviction ==
After the eviction of the Maagdenhuis the CvB instituted a commission to investigate the demands of the protest movement. Humanities Rally created a student-party to further its goals. By 2018 the party absolved itself, stating that they believed the commission and student elections had failed to accomplish anything and that only protests were effective.
