= Metz & Co =

Former department store in Amsterdam

Coordinates: 52°21′58″N 4°53′12″E

- The Metz & Co building on the corner of the Keizersgracht and Leidsestraat, 2011
- Industry: Retail
- Founded: c. 1740 (silk trade, according to the firm); 1857 (as Metz & Co)
- Founder: Moses Samuels Metz
- Defunct: March 2013
- Headquarters: Amsterdam, Netherlands
- Key people: Joseph de Leeuw (director, 1910s–1941); Hendrik de Leeuw (director, after 1945)
- Products: Furniture, furnishing fabrics, decorative arts, women's fashion, hats
- Owner: Liberty (1973–1988)

Metz & Co was a department store in Amsterdam. Its origins lay in an 18th-century trade in French silks, and from 1908 to 2012 it occupied the ground floor and later the whole of the "New York" building on the corner of the Keizersgracht and the Leidsestraat. It was the Dutch agent for Liberty of London from 1902, and under Joseph de Leeuw, its owner between the world wars, it became the leading Dutch outlet for modern furniture and design, selling work by Gerrit Rietveld, J.J.P. Oud, Le Corbusier, Marcel Breuer, Alvar Aalto and others. Rietveld designed the glass and steel pavilion on the building's roof, added in 1933. De Leeuw was removed by the German occupation authorities in 1941 and died in Theresienstadt in 1944. His son continued the business after the war and sold it to Liberty in 1973. The store moved to smaller premises in 2012 and closed the following year.

== History ==
=== Origins ===
According to the firm's own account, Moses Samuels, a merchant from Metz, set up in the Jodenbreestraat around 1740 as a dealer in French silks and ribbons. From 1776 he called himself Moses Samuels Metz. In 1786 he moved his wholesale business to a building called De Koning van Engeland ("The King of England") in the Sint Antoniesbreestraat, and in 1794 he handed it on to his three sons, Samuel, Jonas and Daniel. The last member of the family in the business, Samuel's son Daniel Samuel Metz (1795–1878), sold it in 1857 to his nephew Isaac Magnus Cantor (1833–1905) and Aron Levie Citroen (1808–1877), who traded under the name Metz & Co.

Joseph de Leeuw (1872–1944) joined the firm at the age of thirteen and in 1896 became a partner of Theodoor Citroen, Aron's son. Metz began selling Liberty fabrics in 1895, and in 1902, to stop other shops passing off imitations under the Liberty name, it became Liberty & Co's general agent for the whole of the Netherlands. For years the shop was known as both Metz and Liberty, and the firm used both names in its advertising. The same year it moved to larger premises at Kalverstraat 185–187, and it had its own buying office in Lyon for silks.

=== Keizersgracht and the interwar years ===
The "New York" building

In 1908 the Kalverstraat shop had to make way for an extension of Maison de Bonneterie, and Metz moved into the shop on the ground floor of the "New York" building at Keizersgracht 455, vacated by the firm of F.A.L. de Gruyter. The building had been put up in 1891 to a design by the architect J. van Looy for an American life insurance company, after which it was named; the letters N and Y appear throughout its decoration. (Note: The architect's first name is given as Jacob (Jac.) in the heritage register and as Jan elsewhere.) (Note: The Rijksmonument register names the client as the American Life Insurance Company; other sources give the New York Life Insurance Company.) At 26 metres (85 ft) it was the tallest privately owned building in Amsterdam when it was completed.

De Leeuw became sole director of Metz & Co and owner of the whole building in 1917, (Note: The Dutch-language Wikipedia article dates De Leeuw's sole directorship to 1910 and his purchase of the building to 1918, without citing a source.) and in 1922 had it converted into a store to designs by the architect H.A. van Anrooy, who also designed the firm's workshop building at Kerkstraat 45–49. Metz kept its departments for women's fashion, hats, fabrics and decorative arts, and added a furniture department. Its first head, appointed in 1918, was the interior designer Paul Bromberg; six years later he was succeeded by Willem Penaat. Their designs were made in Metz's own workshop and sold under their names, alongside furniture by foreign designers including Aalto, Le Corbusier, Mies van der Rohe and Breuer. (Note: According to the Dutch-language Wikipedia article, which gives no source for this, Bromberg left in 1924 for the furniture firm H. Pander & Zonen in The Hague. His buying trips abroad brought Metz into contact with designers in France, Germany and Austria, and goods from the Wiener Werkstätte sold well.)

In the 1920s Metz moved away from the Liberty style towards a more independent artistic policy. De Leeuw and his staff chose and bought goods themselves, which was unusual at the time, and the firm worked with about 150 designers, some of whom made products exclusively for it. It sold fabrics designed by Sonia Delaunay and carpets and fabrics by Bart van der Leck, and on the ground floor it showed glass by Venini, Lalique, Hoffmann and Andries Copier of the Leerdam glassworks. (Note: The Dutch-language Wikipedia article names, without a source, the following graphic designers who produced advertising for Metz: Stefan Schlesinger, who handled much of it between 1926 and 1931, Wladimir Bielkine, A.M. Cassandre, Lex Metz and Dick Elffers.)

=== Rietveld ===
Rietveld's Krat (crate) chair, 1934

From 1930 Metz made and sold chairs by Gerrit Rietveld, and later his Zig-Zag Chair. In 1933 Rietveld designed a glass and steel pavilion for the roof of the building, carrying the name METZ. According to Els van Wageningen, he was first asked only to design the lettering of the firm's name for the roof, and the idea of using its steel frame to support a glass exhibition room came while he was working on it. The pavilion was used for exhibitions, at first of tubular steel furniture by Gispen and Oud; a year after it opened it showed furniture by Rietveld, Oud, Burkhalter and Bourgeois. In 1938 the furniture department expanded into Keizersgracht 449, for which Rietveld designed the shop and shopfront.

=== Occupation ===
Metz was still enlarging its fashion department in the spring of 1940, and held a fashion show as late as 1942. On 25 August 1941 a German administrator took over the company; in 1942 he dissolved the limited company and gave Metz's procuration holder authority to run it. De Leeuw, who was Jewish, was forced out. He and his second wife, the actress Elisabeth Herzberg, were interned in the camp for "privileged" Jews at Barneveld on 1 March 1943 and moved to Westerbork on 29 September 1943. He was deported to Theresienstadt on 4 September 1944 and died there on 17 October 1944. His daughter Henriette was murdered in Auschwitz in July 1944.

=== Hendrik de Leeuw and Liberty (1945–1988) ===
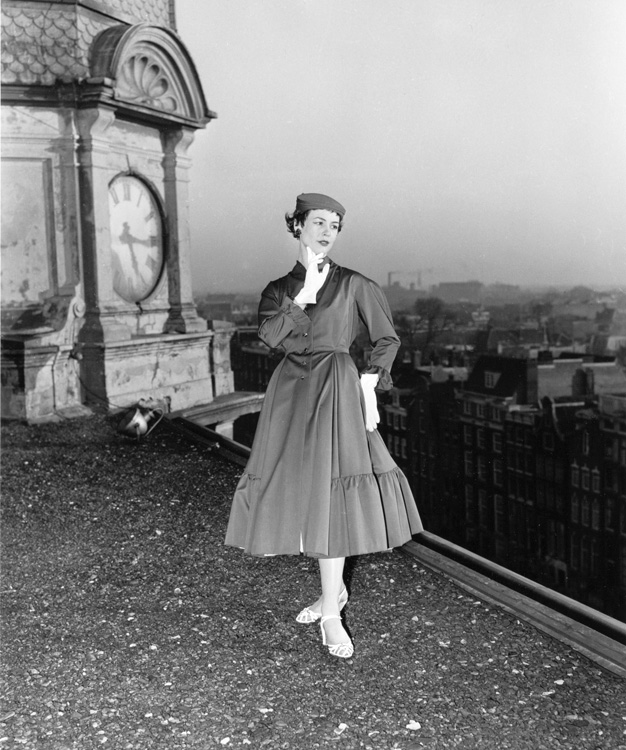
Liberty spring fashion show on the roof of Metz & Co, March 1955

De Leeuw's son Hendrik (1908–1978), deputy director before the war, had spent the war years in the United States. Once the firm's affairs had been settled he took over its management and ran it along the lines his father had set. The first post-war fashion show was held in 1949 at the Victoria Hotel, and the firm again made women's clothes and hats in its own workrooms. Rietveld and Hein Salomonson redesigned the ground floor in 1953. Metz received the title of purveyor to the royal household (hofleverancier) in 1957. (Note: An earlier version of the English Wikipedia article stated, without a source, that Metz had been entitled to display the royal arms as purveyor to the royal household since 1815.) In 1963 the interior architect Jac. Haan became head of the furniture department; the fashion designer Marianne Davids and the window dresser Gerard Hammink also worked for the store in the 1960s. (Note: According to the Dutch-language Wikipedia article, which gives no source for this, brands sold in the post-war decades included Marimekko, Jaeger, Mary Quant and Laura Ashley. Metz closed its couture department around 1970.)

With no successor in the family, Hendrik de Leeuw sold Metz & Co to Liberty of London in 1973. Liberty refitted the store in 1976 with an emphasis on furniture, but the sales area was later reduced and many staff were dismissed. In February 1986 Hendrik Goedkoop became managing director after acquiring a quarter of the shares from Liberty. That autumn the offices and storerooms on the sixth floor, under the roof, were turned into a restaurant with 120 seats and views over the city, designed by Cees Dam, and the marble staircase from the side entrance on the Keizersgracht, until then hidden from customers, was opened to the shop. The changes did not bring a lasting recovery; the ready-to-wear department was closed and more staff were let go. At the end of 1988 Liberty sold the loss-making store to an investment company.

=== Final years ===
In the early 21st century fabrics and furniture gradually gave way to designer clothing. In April 2012, after 104 years in the "New York" building, Metz moved to Leidsestraat 1–3, on the corner of the Herengracht, a building it also owned, roughly halving its floor space. Its director, Gerard Koolbergen, said the old building would be renovated for at least a year for a new tenant, whom he did not name. In March 2013 the store left the Leidsestraat premises too. Its owner said he hoped to reopen in Amsterdam-Zuid.

== Building after Metz ==
The building in 2024

The "New York" building has been a rijksmonument since 1991. Abercrombie & Fitch opened its first Dutch store there on 13 December 2012. It was followed by a branch of Hugo Boss and then by NIO House Amsterdam, the European flagship of the Chinese electric car maker NIO, with interiors by MVRDV, which opened in 2024. The Rietveld pavilion, which had housed the Metz café until the store left and was then closed to the public, became an events space.

== Branches ==
Metz had a branch in The Hague from 1912 to 1981, on the Hoogstraat and later the Plaats. It also had a shop at Schiphol Airport's shopping centre from 1968 to 1988 and, briefly, in the Herestraat in Groningen in 1969–1970. (Note: The Dutch-language Wikipedia article also mentions a short-lived branch in Alkmaar, without a source.) Its furniture workshop was in the Passeerderstraat from 1921 and at 1e Oosterparkstraat 51–53 from 1926 to 1970.

== Historiography and collections ==
Petra Timmer's Metz & Co: de creatieve jaren (1995) covers the years from 1900 to the sale to Liberty in 1973, when Joseph and Hendrik de Leeuw ran the store. Reviewing it in BMGN, S. Wijna judged that Timmer convincingly showed how father and son had made Metz a household name. (Note: According to the Dutch-language Wikipedia article, which gives no source for this, the book accompanied an exhibition of the same name at the Stedelijk Museum Amsterdam that opened on 8 December 1995.) The Stedelijk Museum holds printed matter produced by Metz in the 1930s and a 1955 Metz dress fabric, and the Centraal Museum in Utrecht holds Rietveld's blueprint for the rooftop pavilion.

== Gallery ==
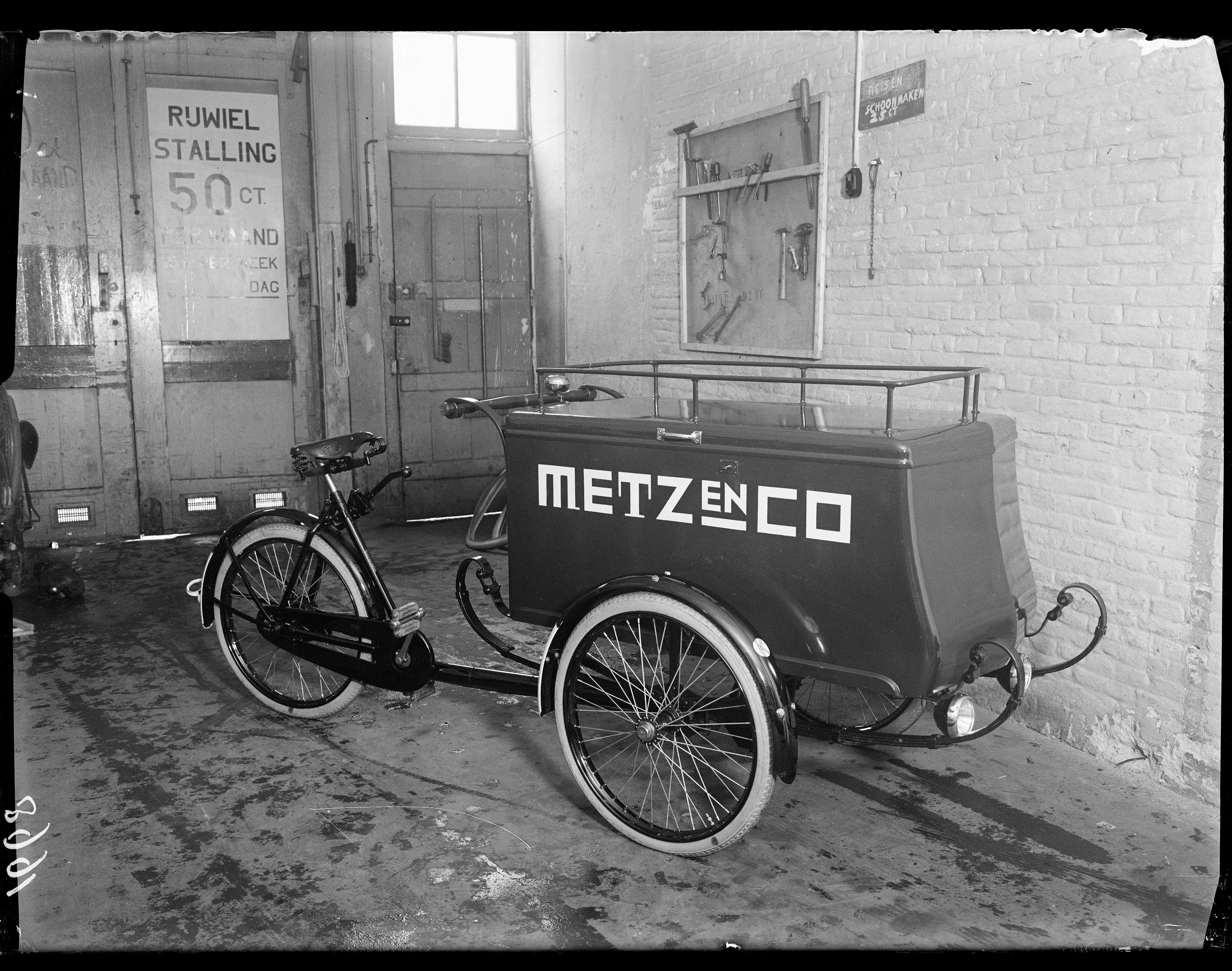
A Metz & Co delivery bicycle, c. 1934

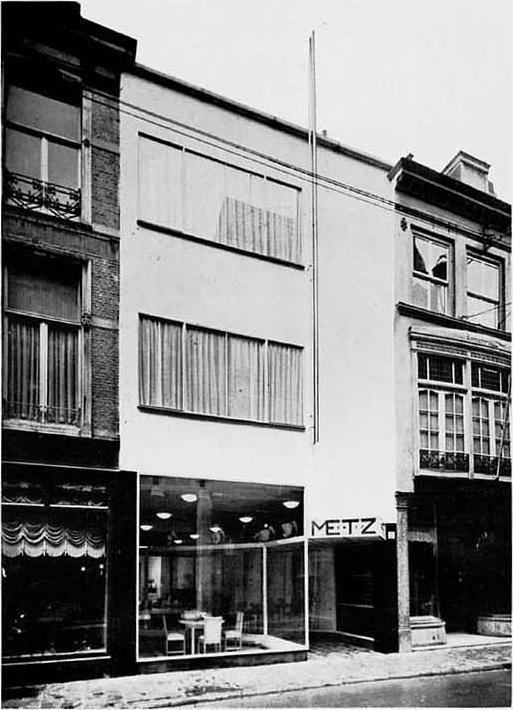
The Hague branch

The "New York" building in 1904, before Metz moved in

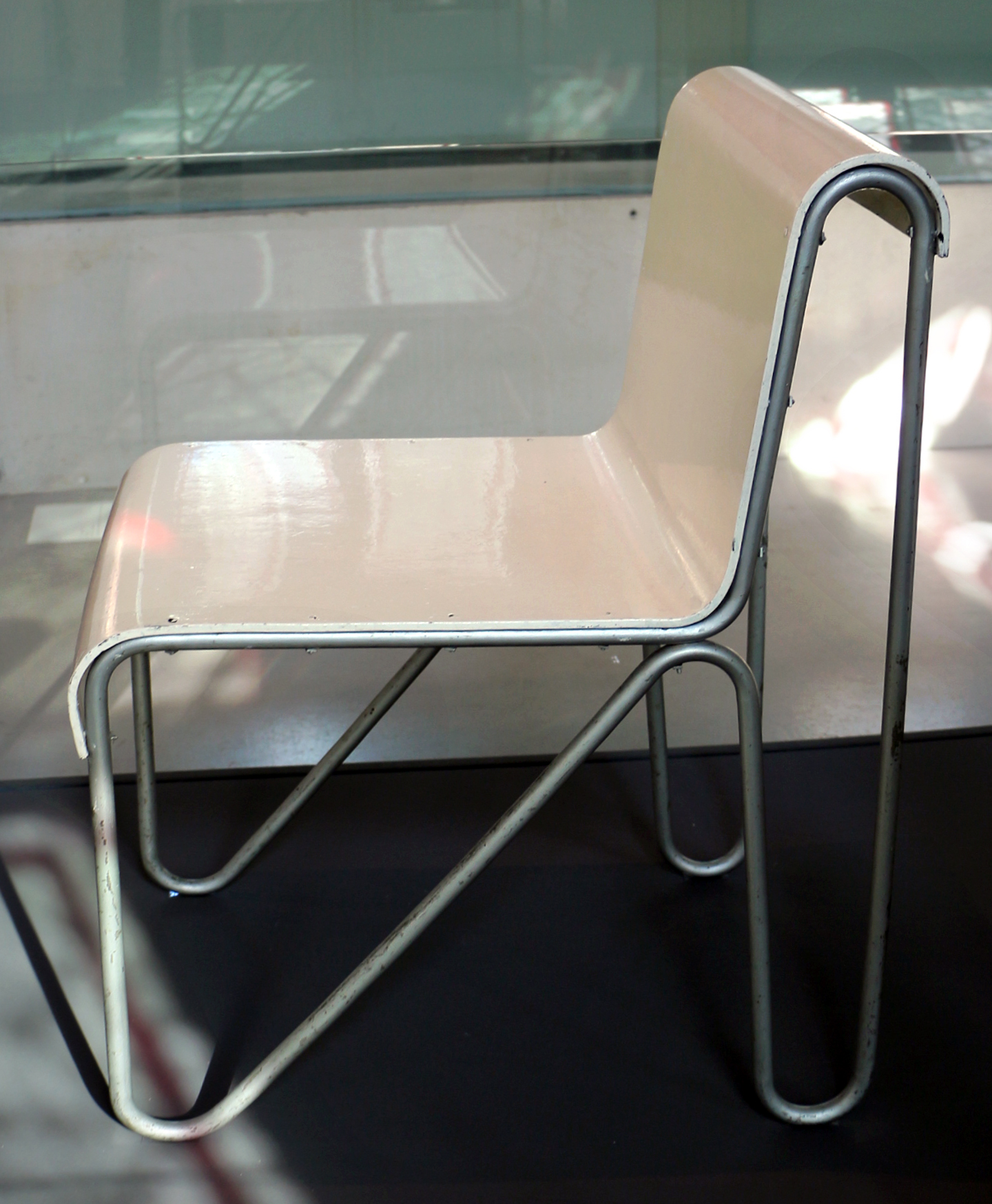
Rietveld tubular-steel chair, designed 1927

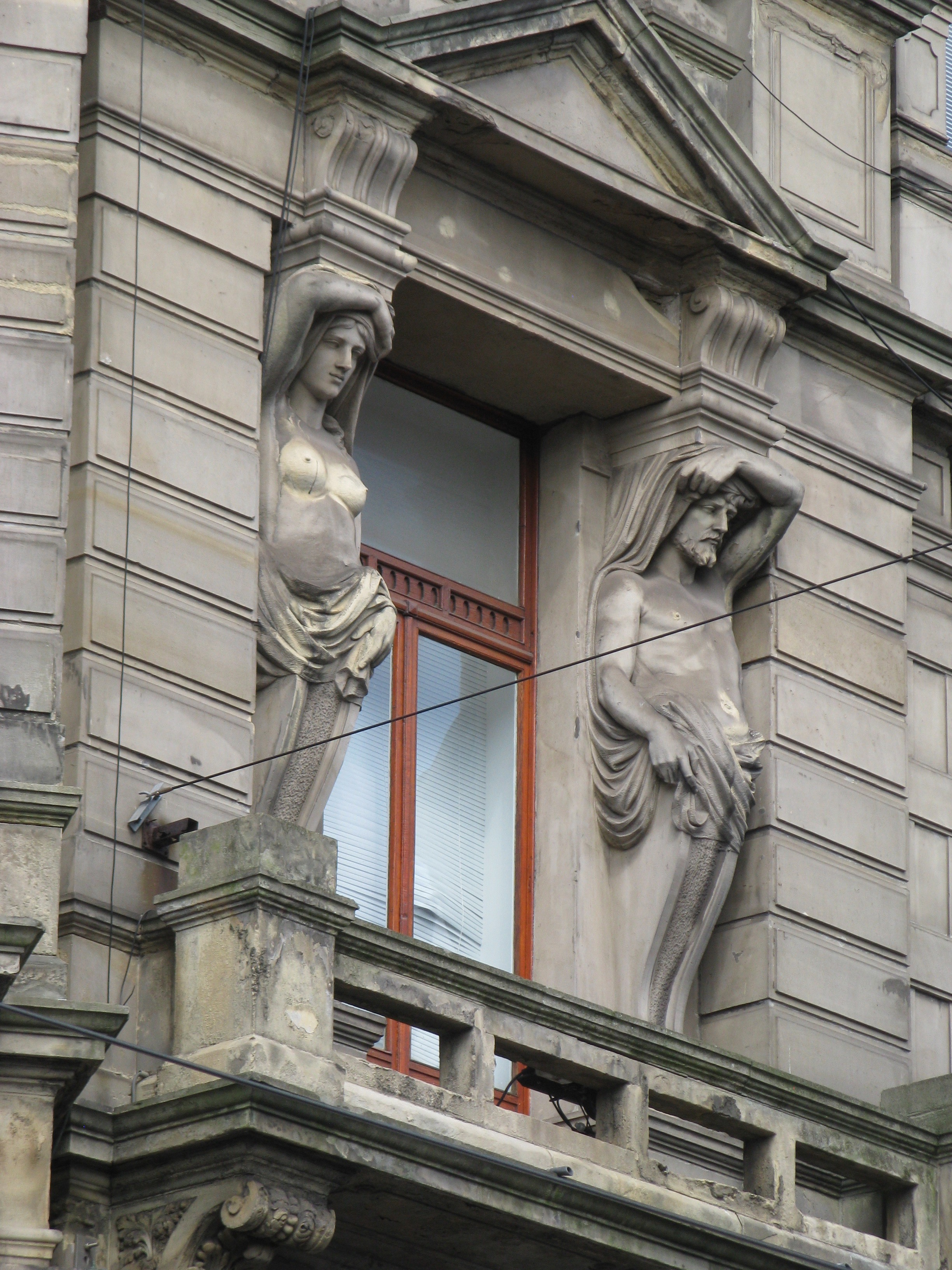
Facade sculpture

Metz hatbox
