= Bungehuis =

Office building in Amsterdam (Netherlands)

Coordinates: 52°22′19.38″N 4°53′21.12″E

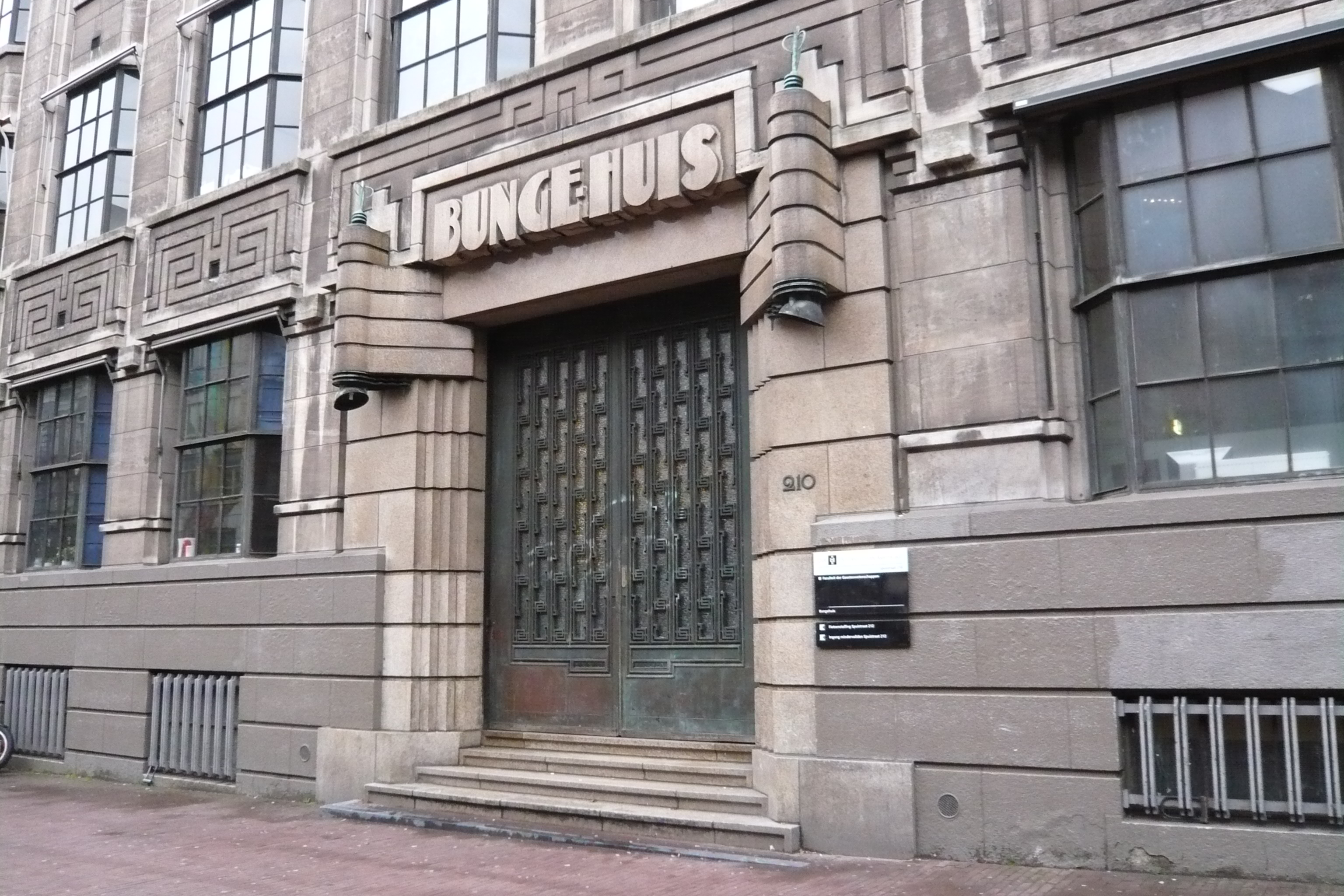
Entrance to the Bungehuis from the Spuistraat; 2011.

The Bungehuis is a monumental office building on the Spuistraat, Amsterdam, built in 1934. In 1971 the building was rented by the University of Amsterdam, which used it to house the department of humanities and later purchased it. The building is a Rijksmonument.

== History ==
The Bungehuis was built as an office building for the N.V. Bunge's Handelmaatschappij. Its design was functionalis. Three of its sides are freestanding; its boundaries are the Paleisstraat, Spuistraat, and Singel.

Twenty houses had to be torn down to make room for the concrete skeleton. The first architect was Adolf Daniël Nicolaas van Gendt, but after his untimely death in 1932, W.J. Klok was assigned the job of finishing the building.

=== University of Amsterdam ===
In 1971 the University of Amsterdam rented the building for the humanities department, as a temporary solution; the permanent home of the department was to be a large building on Uilenburg, near the IJtunnel. In 1974, the university decided against that purchase and bought the Bungehuis. It housed information desks for various language studies, office space, and classrooms. Close by was the PC Hoofthuis, which featured the same functions for the psychology department.

=== Soho House ===
The university desired to sell both buildings to real estate developers. The Bungehuis was sold in February 2015 to Aedes Real Estate, which was to rent it to Soho House, which planned to use it for a private club with restaurant and 79 hotel rooms. Students, however, occupied the building, from 13 February to 24 February, to protest various decisions by the University; the police removed them. In May 2017 a judge ruled that the building may not be turned into a hotel; the Amsterdam municipality announced it would appeal the decision to the Council of State.

The roof terrace was equipped with a rainwater retention system, which keeps almost 14,000 liters of rainwater and delays its entrance into the city's sewage system.

Since 2018 Soho House has operated the building as a private members club and hotel.
