= Tasklist =

Microsoft Windows command

tasklist
- Developers: Microsoft, The AROS Development Team
- Operating system: Microsoft Windows, AROS Research Operating System
- Type: Command

In computing, tasklist is a command available in Microsoft Windows and in the AROS shell. It was included in Windows XP and later Microsoft Windows operating systems.

It is equivalent to the ps command in Unix and Unix-like operating systems and can also be compared with the Windows task manager (taskmgr).

Windows NT 4.0, the Windows 98 Resource Kit, the Windows 2000 Support Tools, and ReactOS include the similar tlist command. Additionally, Microsoft provides the similar PsList command as part of Windows Sysinternals.

== Usage ==
=== Microsoft Windows ===
On Microsoft Windows tasklist shows all of the different local computer processes currently running. tasklist may also be used to show the processes of a remote system by using the command: tasklist /S "SYSTEM".

Optionally, they can be listed sorted by either the imagename, the PID or the amount of computer usage. But by default, they are sorted by chronological order:

 C:\Users\Gigabyte>'''tasklist'''
 
 Image Name                     PID Session Name        Session#    Mem Usage
 ========================= ======== ================ =========== ============
 [[System Idle Process]]              0 Services                   0         20 K
 System                           4 Services                   0      1,008 K
 [[smss.exe]]                       300 Services                   0         84 K
 [[csrss.exe]]                      468 Services                   0        600 K
 [[wininit.exe]]                    532 Services                   0        132 K
 [[services.exe]]                   636 Services                   0      4,672 K
 [[lsass.exe]]                      644 Services                   0      6,532 K
 [[svchost.exe]]                    752 Services                   0      4,824 K
 nvvsvc.exe                     788 Services                   0        208 K
 nvSCPAPISvr.exe                812 Services                   0      1,464 K
 svchost.exe                    856 Services                   0      5,260 K
 svchost.exe                    916 Services                   0      9,308 K
 svchost.exe                    944 Services                   0     26,012 K
 svchost.exe                    128 Services                   0     13,720 K
 svchost.exe                    364 Services                   0     52,152 K
 BootRacerServ.exe             1060 Services                   0        948 K
 svchost.exe                   1108 Services                   0      9,408 K
 spoolsv.exe                   1276 Services                   0        648 K
 svchost.exe                   1308 Services                   0     16,184 K
 sqlwriter.exe                 1700 Services                   0        160 K
 svchost.exe                   1720 Services                   0        204 K
 MsMpEng.exe                   1752 Services                   0     64,556 K
 WUDFHost.exe                  2148 Services                   0        220 K
 svchost.exe                   2188 Services                   0      5,876 K
 svchost.exe                   2636 Services                   0      7,116 K
 dasHost.exe                   2808 Services                   0      5,740 K
 dllhost.exe                   1056 Services                   0        388 K
 DkService.exe                 2708 Services                   0      4,648 K
 FABS.exe                      3580 Services                   0        152 K
 daemonu.exe                   3200 Services                   0      5,584 K
 csrss.exe                     3872 Glass                      1        116 K
 [[winlogon.exe]]                  5928 Glass                      1        156 K
 [[Windows NT startup process#Authentication|LogonUI.exe]]                   1772 Glass                      1        512 K
 [[dwm.exe]]                       4596 Glass                      1        108 K
 csrss.exe                     5968 Glass                      4        128 K
 winlogon.exe                  3364 Glass                      4        156 K
 LogonUI.exe                   6108 Glass                      4        524 K
 dwm.exe                       4764 Glass                      4        136 K
 csrss.exe                     1408 Glass                      2        136 K
 winlogon.exe                  7732 Glass                      2        160 K
 LogonUI.exe                   2036 Glass                      2        524 K
 dwm.exe                       6236 Glass                      2        144 K
 PresentationFontCache.exe     9928 Services                   0        332 K
 csrss.exe                     4948 Glass                      5        128 K
 winlogon.exe                  3708 Glass                      5        156 K
 LogonUI.exe                   5992 Glass                      5        528 K
 dwm.exe                       8756 Glass                      5        152 K
 csrss.exe                     8068 Glass                      8        136 K
 winlogon.exe                  9000 Glass                      8        164 K
 LogonUI.exe                   8240 Glass                      8        524 K
 dwm.exe                       5576 Glass                      8        156 K
 hamachi-2.exe                 6936 Services                   0      1,544 K
 csrss.exe                     6644 Glass                      6        140 K
 winlogon.exe                  4000 Glass                      6        168 K
 LogonUI.exe                   2968 Glass                      6        516 K
 dwm.exe                       6932 Glass                      6        148 K
 csrss.exe                     2452 Glass                      9        136 K
 winlogon.exe                  6244 Glass                      9        160 K
 LogonUI.exe                   1996 Glass                      9        520 K
 dwm.exe                        384 Glass                      9        148 K
 svchost.exe                   2060 Services                   0        176 K
 csrss.exe                      268 Glass                      7        140 K
 winlogon.exe                 13088 Glass                      7        172 K
 LogonUI.exe                   4256 Glass                      7        528 K
 dwm.exe                       6700 Glass                      7        156 K
 csrss.exe                     3516 Glass                     10        136 K
 winlogon.exe                  3104 Glass                     10        172 K
 csrss.exe                     6820 Console                   12      1,856 K
 winlogon.exe                  5228 Console                   12        184 K
 LogonUI.exe                  12020 Glass                     10        528 K
 dwm.exe                       7280 Console                   12     10,200 K
 dwm.exe                      12236 Glass                     10        176 K
 nvxdsync.exe                 12648 Console                   12        316 K
 nvvsvc.exe                     892 Console                   12        440 K
 taskhostex.exe               11880 Console                   12      3,132 K
 [[explorer.exe]]                 12224 Console                   12     35,076 K
 LiveComm.exe                 11624 Console                   12      6,756 K
 RuntimeBroker.exe             5408 Console                   12      8,244 K
 RAVCpl64.exe                 11200 Console                   12        332 K
 ZPSTray.exe                  11100 Console                   12        304 K
 Mini_Monitor.exe             11740 Console                   12      4,532 K
 firefox.exe                     88 Console                   12    201,512 K
 plugin-container.exe         13120 Console                   12      1,148 K
 FlashPlayerPlugin_11_5_50    11484 Console                   12        612 K
 FlashPlayerPlugin_11_5_50     9276 Console                   12      1,748 K
 [[Taskmgr.exe]]                   7908 Console                   12     24,588 K
 [[Windows Management Instrumentation|WmiPrvSE.exe]]                 12568 Services                   0      5,284 K
 [[cmd.exe]]                       3020 Console                   12      2,092 K
 conhost.exe                   7352 Console                   12      4,676 K
 tasklist.exe                  9072 Console                   12      5,516 K
 WmiPrvSE.exe                  6384 Services                   0      5,708 K
 
 C:\Users\Gigabyte>[[taskkill]]/PID 0409/F

== See also ==
- Task manager
- nmon — a system monitor tool for the AIX and Linux operating systems.
- pgrep
- pstree
- top
