= Skill (disambiguation) =

A skill is the learned capacity to carry out pre-determined results.

Skill may also refer to:

- Skill (labor), a measure of a worker's abilities
- The Skill, an album by The Sherbs
- Skill F.C. de Bruxelles, a defunct Belgian football (soccer) club
- Skills (company), a San Francisco, California, U.S., event promoter, record label and store
- Cadence SKILL, a scripting language
- USS Skill, at least two ships of the United States Navy
- Forecast skill, a scaled representation of forecast error compared to a reference model
- Skill, in role-playing game statistics, the learned knowledge and abilities of a character
- Skill: National Bureau for Students With Disabilities, a UK charity for students with disabilities
- skill (see snice), is a command-line utility to send a signal or report process status, pkill is favoured over it; see also top, kill, nice

== See also ==
- Skil (disambiguation)
- Skillz (disambiguation)
