= SYSTAT =

SYSTAT or Systat may refer to

- SYSTAT (statistics package), a statistics and statistical graphics software package
- SYSTAT (DEC), a command on the DEC TOPS-10 and RSTS/E computer operating systems
- sysstat, a command-line tool that displays active processes and users
- systat (BSD), a BSD UNIX command-line tool to display system statistics in a full-screen view using ncurses/curses
- systat (protocol) (or Active Users), an Internet protocol
