= Mpstat =

Software that show processor-related statistics

mpstat is a computer command-line software used in Unix-type operating systems to report (on the screen) processor-related statistics. It is used in computer monitoring in order to diagnose problems or to build statistics about a computer's CPU usage.

== Description ==
The mpstat command writes to standard output activities for each available processor.

The mpstat command can be used both on SMP and UP machines, but in the latter, only global average activities will be printed.

== Usage ==
$ mpstat <interval> <count>

Interval is the time in seconds between printing out a line of statistics. Count is the number of lines of output you want.

Note that the first line of output from mpstat (like iostat, vmstat, etc.) contains averages since system boot. The subsequent lines will show current values.

== Examples ==
Different examples of output under different operating systems:

under Linux kernel 4.14 on a two CPU machine:

Linux 4.14.24.mptcp (hostname) 	05/23/2018 	_x86_64_	(2 CPU)

03:51:19 PM  CPU    %usr   %nice    %sys %iowait    %irq   %soft  %steal  %guest  %gnice   %idle
03:51:20 PM  all    2.51    0.00    2.01    0.00    0.00    0.00    0.00    0.00    0.00   95.48
03:51:21 PM  all    2.53    0.00    2.02    0.00    0.00    0.00    0.00    0.00    0.00   95.45

under Linux kernel 2.4:

$ mpstat
Linux 2.4.21-32.ELsmp (linux00)        07/04/07

10:26:54     CPU   %user   %nice %system %iowait    %irq   %soft   %idle    intr/s
10:26:54     all    0.07    0.00    0.16    8.48    0.00    0.09   91.18    165.49

under Solaris 11:

$ mpstat
CPU minf mjf xcal  intr ithr  csw icsw migr smtx  srw syscl  usr sys  wt idl
  0    0   0    0   329  121  169    6    0    0    0   406    0   1   0  98

under AIX 6:

$ mpstat 1 1

System configuration: lcpu=8 ent=1.0 mode=Uncapped

cpu  min  maj  mpc  int   cs  ics   rq  mig lpa sysc us sy wa id   pc  %ec  lcs
  0    8    0    0  182  336  102    0    0 100 1434 38 51  0 12 0.02  1.8  185
  1    0    0    0   11    5    5    0    0   -    0  0 19  0 81 0.00  0.1   12
  2    0    0    0    1    0    0    0    0   -    0  0 42  0 58 0.00  0.0    0
  3    0    0    0    1    0    0    0    0   -    0  0 43  0 57 0.00  0.0    0
  4    0    0    0    1    0    0    0    0   -    0  0 45  0 55 0.00  0.0    0
  5    0    0    0    1    0    0    0    0   -    0  0 44  0 56 0.00  0.0    0
  6    0    0    0    1    0    0    0    0   -    0  0  2  0 98 0.00  0.0    0
  7    0    0    0   53    5    5    0    0   -    0  0 66  0 34 0.00  0.2   54
  U    -    -    -    -    -    -    -    -   -    -  -  -  0 99 0.99 99.0    -
ALL    8    0    0  251  346  112    0    0 100 1434  0  0  0 99 0.02  2.0  251

== See also ==
- nmon
- top
