= Systat (BSD) =

Command-line software

systat
- Original author: Computer Systems Research Group
- Initial release: 4.3BSD (June 1986; 39 years ago)
- Repository: usr.bin/systat/: FreeBSD; OpenBSD; NetBSD; DragonFly
- Written in: C
- Operating system: BSD UNIX
- Type: system monitor
- Licence: BSD Licence
- Website: systat(1)

systat is a BSD UNIX console application for displaying system statistics in fullscreen mode using ncurses/curses. It is available on, and by default ships in the base systems of, FreeBSD, NetBSD, OpenBSD and DragonFly BSD. It was first released as part of 4.3BSD in 1986; 39 years ago.

Both internally and in the interface of the user the utility consists of several distinct modules and tabs, referred to as "displays" in FreeBSD, NetBSD and DragonFly, and "views" in OpenBSD, which are automatically refreshed every specified number of seconds. These modules cover all system components, including statistics resembling vmstat, iostat and netstat in all of the BSDs, as well as pf and sensors views in some of the BSDs. The systat utility is notably absent from OS X, where a GUI-based Activity Monitor performs similar functions.

== See also ==
- vmstat
- iostat
- top
- netstat
