= Task manager =

System monitor program

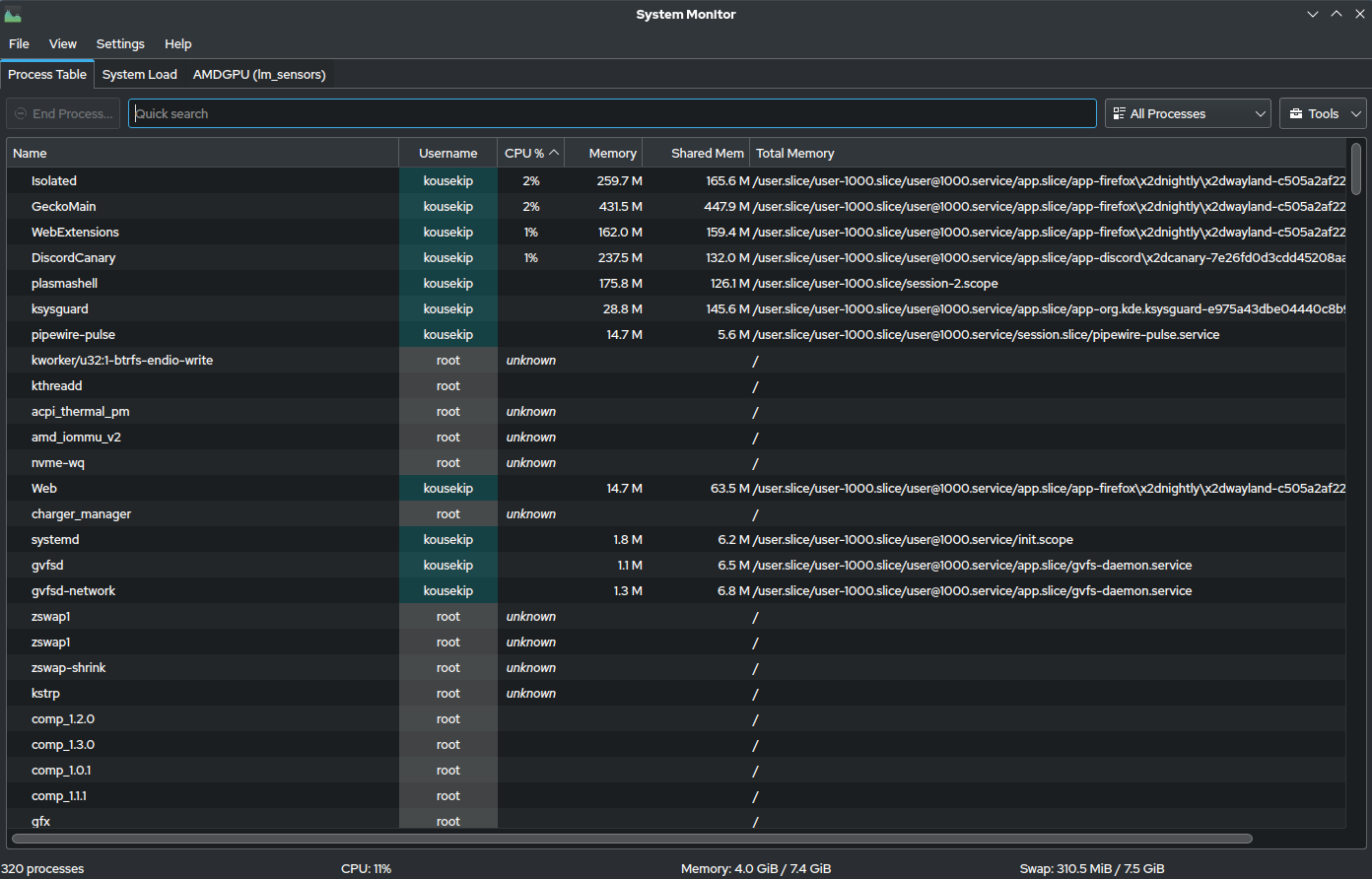
KDE System Guard, a task manager for KDE Plasma 5

In operating systems, a task manager is a system monitor program used to provide information about the processes and applications running on a computer, as well as the general status of the computer. Some implementations can also be used to terminate processes and applications, as well as change the processes' scheduling priority.

Task managers can display running services (processes), as well as those that were stopped. They can display information about the services, including their process identifier and group identifier.

In some environments, users can access a task manager with the Control-Alt-Delete keyboard shortcut.

== Common task managers ==
- Activity Monitor, included in macOS
- Conky, for the X Window System
- htop, for the Unix shell
- Plasma System Monitor, included in KDE Plasma Desktop
- nmon, for Linux and AIX
- ps, for the Unix shell
- Task Manager, included in Windows
- tasklist, for DOS
- TaskManager, included in MorphOS
- top, for the Unix shell
- Browser Task Manager in Chromium-based browsers such as Google Chrome and Microsoft Edge, which displays CPU and memory usage of tabs

== Task list in mobile operating systems ==
In mobile operating systems, such as iOS, Android, and Windows Phone, the simpler task list may be used instead of the task manager.
