= Run queue =

Data structure of processes waiting for CPU time

In modern computers many processes run at once. Active processes are placed in an array called a run queue, or runqueue. The run queue may contain priority values for each process, which will be used by the scheduler to determine which process to run next. To ensure each program has a fair share of resources, each one is run for some time period (quantum) before it is paused and placed back into the run queue. When a program is stopped to let another run, the program with the highest priority in the run queue is then allowed to execute.

Processes are also removed from the run queue when they ask to sleep, are waiting on a resource to become available, or have been terminated.

In the Linux operating system (prior to kernel 2.6.23), each CPU in the system is given a run queue, which maintains both an active and expired array of processes. Each array contains 140 (one for each priority level) pointers to doubly linked lists, which in turn reference all processes with the given priority. The scheduler selects the next process from the active array with highest priority. When a process' quantum expires, it is placed into the expired array with some priority. When the active array contains no more processes, the scheduler swaps the active and expired arrays, hence the name O(1) scheduler.

In UNIX or Linux, the sar command is used to check the run queue.

The vmstat UNIX or Linux command can also be used to determine the number of processes that are queued to run or waiting to run. These appear in the 'r' column.

Example:

$ vmstat
procs -----------memory---------- ---swap-- -----io---- -system-- ------cpu-----
 r  b   swpd   free   buff  cache   si   so    bi    bo   in   cs us sy id wa st
 2  0      0 4579152 324416 4619528    0    0   402   236 3357   15 20  2 78  0  0

There are two models for Run queues: one that assigns a Run Queue to each physical processor, and the other has only one Run Queue in the system

== See also ==
- Completely Fair Scheduler, the scheduling algorithm used by Linux since kernel 2.6.23
