= Pstree =

Unix command that shows the running processes as a tree

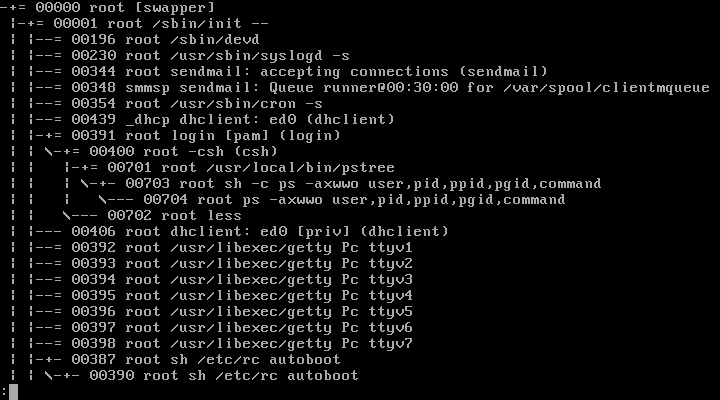
pstree output in FreeBSD

pstree is a Linux command that shows the running processes as a tree. It is used as a more visual alternative to the ps command. The root of the tree is either init or the process with the given pid. It can also be installed in other Unix systems.

In FreeBSD, a similar output is created using ps -d, in Linux ps axjf produces similar output.

== Examples ==
pstree pid

user@host ~$ pstree 1066
rsyslogd─┬─{in:imjournal}
         └─{rs:main Q:Reg}

pstree username

user@host ~# pstree username
dbus-daemon───{dbus-daemon}

dbus-launch

bash───firefox─┬─6*[{Analysis Helper}]
               ├─{BgHangManager}
               ├─{Cache2 I/O}
               ├─{Compositor}
               ├─{GMPThread}
               ├─{Gecko_IOThread}
               ├─{Hang Monitor}
               ├─{ImageBridgeChil}
               ├─{ImageIO}
               ├─{JS Watchdog}
               ├─{Link Monitor}
               ├─{Socket Thread}
               ├─{SoftwareVsyncTh}
               ├─{StreamTrans #1}
               ├─{Timer}
               └─{gmain}

== See also ==
- top
- ps
- kill
- nice
- tree
