= Iftop =

Real-time bandwidth usage software

iftop
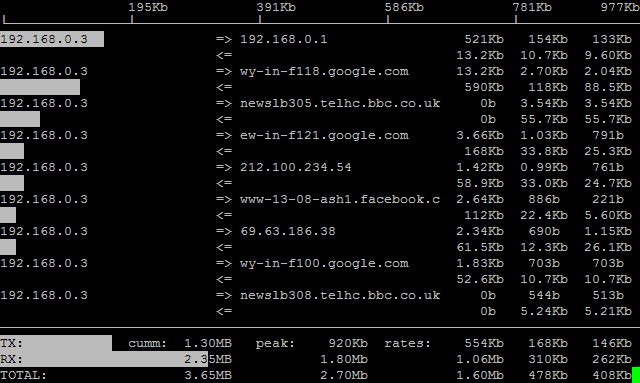
- Developer: Paul Warren
- Release: March 2, 2002; 24 years ago
- Stable release: 0.17
- Written in: C
- Operating system: Unix-like
- Type: Bandwidth usage / System monitor
- License: GNU General Public License
- Website: www.ex-parrot.com/pdw/iftop/
- Repository: https://code.blinkace.com/pdw/iftop

iftop is a free software command-line system monitor tool developed by Paul Warren. It produces a real-time stream of incoming and outgoing network communications from the operating system iftop is running within. By default, the connections are ordered by bandwidth usage, with only the largest ("top") bandwidth consumers shown. It is analogous to top, but instead of system-wide resource monitoring, it focuses on displaying just network usage. iftop is typically used for monitoring bandwidth consumption, and while investigating unknown consumers of available network bandwidth.

== Description ==
iftop is a passive monitoring tool. This program monitors network traffic and displays a table of current bandwidth usage, bandwidth measured in bits per second at default, and may be changed to bytes per second with the command line option.

An interface may be specified' if not, it will listen on the first interface it finds that appears to be external.

By default, iftop will look up hostnames associated with addresses and counts all IP packets that pass through the filter.

A feature of iftop is that it can suppress display of DNS traffic by using a filter code such as "not port domain", or switch it off entirely, by using the -n option or by pressing "n" when the program is running. Using the -F option makes it possible to show packets entering and leaving a given network.

iftop may be used for inspecting TCP or UDP ports also, using the option -P.

== See also ==
- Linux/UNIX system performance commands
- htop
- netsniff-ng's ifpps top-like statistics tool
- ntop
- MTR (software)
- List of Unix commands
