= W (Unix) =

Unix computer command

w
- Operating system: Unix and Unix-like
- Type: Command

The command w on many Unix-like operating systems provides a quick summary of every user logged into a computer, what each user is currently doing, and what load all the activity is imposing on the computer itself. The command is a one-command combination of several other Unix programs: who, uptime, and ps -a.

== Example ==
Sample output (which may vary between systems):

$ w
 11:12am up 608 day(s), 19:56,  6 users,  load average: 0.36, 0.36, 0.37
User     tty       login@  idle  what
smithj   pts/5      8:52am       w
jonesm   pts/23    20Apr06    28 -bash
harry    pts/18     9:01am     9 pine
peterb   pts/19    21Apr06       emacs -nw html/index.html
janetmcq pts/8     10:12am 3days -csh
singh    pts/12    16Apr06  5:29 /usr/bin/perl -w perl/test/program.pl
