= Skil (disambiguation) =

Skil is a manufacturer of power tools

Skil or SKIL may also refer to:

- Skil (cycling team), a French road-racing team 1984–1986
- Skil–Shimano, the name used by the men's road cycling team Team Picnic–PostNL in 2006–2011
- Skilfish
- Sablefish
- SKIL, a gene
- Schunck's KledingIndustrie Limburg, a German clothing company, a predecessor to Schunck

== See also ==
- Skill (disambiguation)
