= Killall =

Command line utility

killall is a command line utility available on Unix-like systems. There are two very different implementations.

- The implementation supplied with genuine UNIX System V (including Solaris) and Linux sysvinit tools kills all processes that the user is able to kill, potentially shutting down the system if run by root.
- The implementation supplied with the FreeBSD (including Mac OS X) and Linux psmisc tools is similar to the pkill and skill commands, killing only the processes specified on the command line.

Both commands operate by sending a signal, like the kill program.

== Example usage ==
Kill all processes named xmms:

killall xmms

== See also ==
- List of Unix commands
- Signal (computing)
