= Sysstat =

Performance monitoring tools for Linux

sysstat
- Developer: Sébastien Godard
- Stable release: 12.7.9 / December 7, 2025; 10 months ago
- Written in: C
- Operating system: Linux
- Type: Performance Monitor
- License: GPLv2
- Website: sysstat.github.io
- Repository: github.com/sysstat

sysstat (system statistics) is a collection of performance monitoring tools for Linux. It is available on Unix and Unix-like operating systems.

Software included in sysstat package:

- sar(1): Collect, report, or save system activity information. – Linux User Commands Manual
- sa1(8): Collect and store binary data in the system activity daily data file. – Linux Administration and Privileged Commands Manual
- sa2(8): shell variant of sar, supporting the same flags as sar command which write a daily report in the /var/log/sa directory. – Linux Administration and Privileged Commands Manual
- sadf(1): , similar to sar but can write its data in different formats (CSV, XML, etc.). This is useful to load performance data into a database, or import them in a spreadsheet to make graphs.
- iostat(1): reports basic CPU statistics and input/output statistics for devices, partitions and network filesystems. – Linux User Commands Manual
- mpstat(1): reports individual or combined processor related statistics. – Linux User Commands Manual
- pidstat(1): reports statistics for Linux tasks (processes) : I/O, CPU, memory, etc. – Linux User Commands Manual
- nfsiostat(1): reports input/output statistics for network filesystems (NFS). – Linux User Commands Manual
- cifsiostat(1): reports I/O statistics for CIFS resources. – Linux User Commands Manual

== See also ==
- sar (Unix)
