= Dave Plummer =

Canadian-American programmer and entrepreneur

- Plummer in 2023
- Born: David William Plummer; 1968 (age 57–58); Regina, Saskatchewan, Canada
- Other name: davepl
- Occupations: Programmer; entrepreneur
- Known for: Windows Task Manager; Space Cadet Pinball port for Windows NT; Visual Zip for Windows; Windows XP Product Activation
- Children: 4

YouTube information
- Channel: Dave's Garage
- Years active: 2018–present
- Subscribers: 1.11 million
- Views: 86.7 million
- Last updated: April 14, 2026

David William Plummer (born 1968) is a Canadian-American programmer and entrepreneur. He created the Task Manager for Windows, the Space Cadet Pinball ports to Windows NT, Zip file support for Windows, HyperCache for the Amiga and many other software products. He has been issued six patents in the software engineering space. He is known for his YouTube channels, Dave's Garage and Dave's Attic.

== Personal life ==
David William Plummer was born in 1968 at the Regina General Hospital, in Regina, Saskatchewan, Canada, where he was also raised. As a child, Plummer spent much of his free time at his father's hardware store and his grandfather's workshop. When he was 11, he had his first interaction with a computer at a local RadioShack; he helped them set up their newly arrived computer even though he had no previous experience.

Plummer discovered that the University of Regina had a computer lab that he could access on Saturday mornings. He began going there every week to use and explore their computers. Shortly after, his mother enrolled him in a computer class at the University of Regina that was offered to the community.

He attended Miller High School, but dropped out during his senior year. As a teenager, he created several video games for the Commodore 64, including Tour de Force. After working various jobs and programming a computer game with a friend, he returned to high school at the age of 21 and graduated. He then enrolled in the University of Regina and graduated in 1994 with a Bachelor's of Science in computer science with high honors.

As of 2021, Plummer lives with his wife Nicole and their four children in Sammamish, Washington.

Plummer said in a 2021 YouTube video that he is autistic, and has ADHD. He also wrote a book about his experiences with autism and how it has impacted his life, titled Secrets of the Autistic Millionaire: Everything I know about Autism, ASD, and Asperger's that I wish I'd known back then.

== Career ==
Plummer moved to Redmond, Washington, in 1993 to work for Microsoft as an intern in the MS-DOS department, working for Ben Slivka. He was later offered a full-time job with the company for $35,000 a year.

Plummer said in a 2021 interview: "As intern I wrote a bunch of major features, like Smart Drive cache for CD-ROM, and DISKCOPY".

While employed at Microsoft, Plummer began creating the Task Manager program at his home. Plummer eventually showed his newly developed program to Dave Cutler, who allowed him to bring his project into work, upload it to the system, and fine tune the program into what was eventually released with the 1996 shipments of Microsoft computers. During his tenure with Microsoft, Plummer's works included MS-DOS 6.2 and Windows NT, Task Manager, and Space Cadet Pinball.

Plummer left Microsoft in 2003 to start his own company, SoftwareOnline LLC, a software vendor. Plummer claimed that the company went on to sell millions of copies of first and third party utilities software for Windows.

In 2006, SoftwareOnline was sued by The Washington State Attorney General's Office for alleged violations of the Consumer Protection Act after complaints were made about two products called "Registry Cleaner" and "InternetShield". SoftwareOnline agreed to pay $150,000 in civil penalties, plus $250,000 that was ultimately suspended following compliance with all terms in the settlement, as well as $40,000 in legal fees. He also founded Xeriton Corporation during this period, whose major product was the Blue Phone technical support service. In December 2009, Xeriton was sold to Support.com for $8.5 million.

He continues to code in his free time and in 2018 started a YouTube channel called Dave's Garage, where he creates a variety of content regarding computer programming and his personal interest, cars.

On November 25, 2020, Plummer released a YouTube video that described his role in selecting the ballast data for the Windows XP anti-piracy protection. Plummer claims to have used the digital images of Microsoft Bob as the initial seed into the pseudorandom number generation that produced the ballast, so that the "digital spirit of Bob" was included with approximately 500,000,000 Windows XP installations.

Plummer has given lectures at universities including the University of Regina (2018, 2020, 2022) and the University of Oxford (2021).

In 2026, Plummer announced TMOG, a version of the Task Manager written for modern computers. It is available for MacOS, Windows and Linux, for free. There are plans for a future paid pro version which unlocks additional features.
