= Pkill =

Command-line utility for signaling processes

pkill
- Operating system: Unix, Unix-like
- Platform: Cross-platform
- Type: Command

pkill (see pgrep) is a command-line utility initially written for use with the Solaris 7 operating system in 1998. It has since been reimplemented for Linux and some BSDs.

As with the kill and killall commands, pkill is used to send signals to processes. The pkill command allows the use of extended regular expression patterns and other matching criteria.

== Example usage ==
Kill the most recently created acroread process:

pkill -n acroread

Send a USR1 signal to acroread process:

pkill -USR1 acroread

== See also ==
Some other unix commands related to process management and killing include:

- kill, which sends signals processes by process ID instead of by pattern-matching against the name.
- renice, which changes the priority of a process.
- top and htop, which display a list of processes and their resource usage; htop can send signals to processes directly from this list.
- skill, a command-line utility to send signals or report process status. pkill is favoured over it.
