= Xkill =

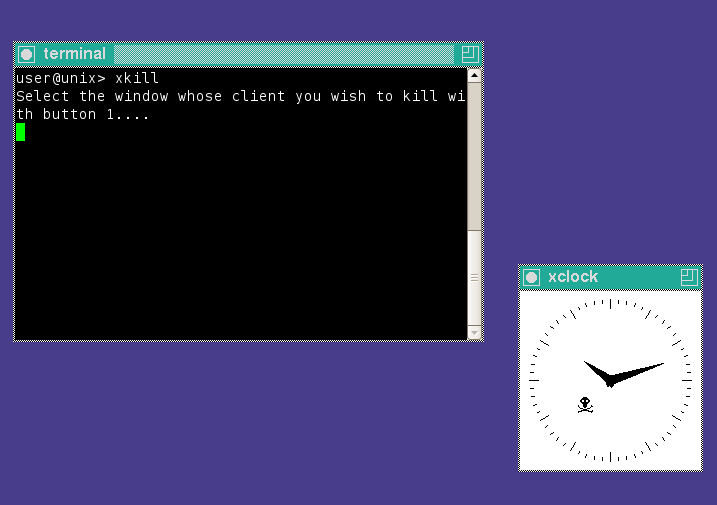
The usage of xkill: Before killing xclock...

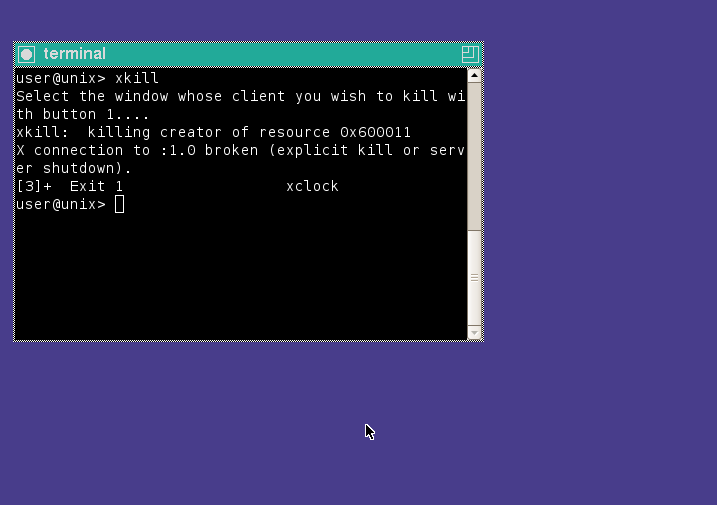
...and the same desktop after the successfully killed window

Xkill is a utility program distributed with the X Window System that instructs the X server to forcefully terminate its connection to a client, thus "killing" the client. When run with no command-line arguments, the program displays a special cursor (usually a crosshair or a skull and crossbones) and displays a message such as

Select the window whose client you wish to kill with button 1 ...

If a non-root window is then selected, the server will close its connection to the client that created that window, and the window will be destroyed.

Xkill is not intended to be used as a routine way to terminate X client programs, but only as a last resort to abort malfunctioning or malicious clients.

Unlike kill, xkill does not request that the client process, which may be running on a different machine, be terminated. In fact, the process can continue running without an X connection. Most clients, however, do abort when their X connections are unexpectedly closed.

Xkill has been cited as an example of a program with a simple and appealing user interface. Its mode of operation has been summed up as "Just click the bad thing with the skull and it dies."
