= Skillz =

Skillz may refer to:

- Skillz (company), an online mobile multiplayer video game competition platform
- Skillz (rapper) (born 1974), American rapper, DJ, and producer
- "Skillz", a song by XO-IQ, featured in the television series Make It Pop

== See also ==
- Skill (disambiguation)
