= National Bureau for Students with Disabilities =

Charity in the United Kingdom for disabled people

Skill: National Bureau for Students With Disabilities, formerly called the National Bureau for Handicapped Students, is a UK charity promoting opportunities for people with any kind of disability in post-16 education, training and employment across the UK.

Skill was established in 1974; By Ronald E. Sturt. Skill: National Bureau for Students with Disabilities is a company limited by guarantee and a registered charity.

== History ==
National Bureau for Students with Disabilities (SKILL) was established by Ronald E. Sturt in 1974, a librarian who founded the talking newspaper in Britain. Since 1974, SKILL has been helping people over 16 with disabilities to lead an independent life.
