= Sar (Unix) =

Unix command to collect, report or save system activity information

sar
- Stable release: sysstat 12.7.6 / July 3, 2024; 8 months ago
- Repository: github.com/sysstat
- Written in: C
- Operating system: AIX, Linux, Solaris, HP-UX
- Type: System reporting
- Website: sysstat.github.io

Called regularly by cron, sadc does the monitoring and stores its measurements to files in the /var/log/sa/ folder. The sar client can be used to explore this data.

System Activity Report (sar) is a Unix System V-derived system monitor command used to report on various system loads, including CPU activity, memory/paging, interrupts, device load, network and swap space utilization. Sar uses /proc filesystem for gathering information.

== Platform support ==
Sar was originally developed for the Unix System V operating system; it is available in AIX, HP-UX, Solaris and other System V based operating systems but it is not available for macOS or FreeBSD. Prior to 2013 there was a bsdsar tool, but it is now deprecated.

Most Linux distributions provide sar utility through the sysstat package.

== Syntax ==
sar [-flags] [ -e time ] [ -f filename ] [-i sec ] [ -s time ]

-f
filename Uses filename as the data source for sar. The default is the current daily data file /var/adm/sa/sadd.
-e
time Selects data up to time. The default is 18:00.
-i
sec Selects data at intervals as close as possible to sec seconds.

== Example ==
[user@localhost]$ sar  # Displays current CPU activity.

== Sysstat package ==
Additional to sar command, Linux sysstat package in Debian, RedHat Enterprise Linux and SuSE provides additional reporting tools:

- sar(1): Collect, report, or save system activity information. – Linux User Commands Manual
- sa1(8): Collect and store binary data in the system activity daily data file. – Linux Administration and Privileged Commands Manual
- sa2(8): shell variant of sar, supporting the same flags as sar command which write a daily report in the /var/log/sa directory. – Linux Administration and Privileged Commands Manual
- sadf(1): , similar to sar but can write its data in different formats (CSV, XML, etc.). This is useful to load performance data into a database, or import them in a spreadsheet to make graphs.
- iostat(1): reports basic CPU statistics and input/output statistics for devices, partitions and network filesystems. – Linux User Commands Manual
- mpstat(1): reports individual or combined processor related statistics. – Linux User Commands Manual
- pidstat(1): reports statistics for Linux tasks (processes) : I/O, CPU, memory, etc. – Linux User Commands Manual
- nfsiostat(1): reports input/output statistics for network filesystems (NFS). – Linux User Commands Manual
- cifsiostat(1): reports I/O statistics for CIFS resources. – Linux User Commands Manual

== See also ==
- atopsar
- Nmon
- sag - "system activity graph" command
- ksar- BSD licensed Java-based application to create graph of all parameters from the data collected by Unix sar utilities.
- CURT, IBM AIX CPU Usage Reporting Tool
- isag, tcl based command to plot sar/sysstat data
