= Vmstat =

Computer system monitoring tool

vmstat
- Developer: AT&T Bell Laboratories
- Release: February 1985; 41 years ago
- Operating system: Unix and Unix-like
- Type: Command

vmstat (virtual memory statistics) is a computer system monitoring tool that collects and displays summary information about operating system memory, processes, interrupts, paging and block I/O. Users of vmstat can specify a sampling interval which permits observing system activity in near-real time.

The vmstat tool is available on most Unix and Unix-like operating systems, such as FreeBSD, Linux or Solaris.

== Syntax ==
The syntax and output of vmstat often differs slightly between different operating systems.

# vmstat 2 6
procs -----------memory---------- ---swap-- -----io---- --system-- ----cpu----
 r  b   swpd   free   buff  cache   si   so    bi    bo   in    cs us sy id wa
 0  0   2536  21496 185684 1353000    0    0     0    14    1     2  0  0 100  0
 0  0   2536  21496 185684 1353000    0    0     0    28 1030   145  0  0 100  0
 0  0   2536  21496 185684 1353000    0    0     0     0 1026   132  0  0 100  0
 0  0   2536  21520 185684 1353000    0    0     0     0 1033   186  1  0 99  0
 0  0   2536  21520 185684 1353000    0    0     0     0 1024   141  0  0 100  0
 0  0   2536  21584 185684 1353000    0    0     0     0 1025   131  0  0 100  0

In the above example the tool reports every two seconds for six iterations.

We can get the customized or required outputs by using various options with the vmstat command.

# vmstat –s
This option is used to get memory statistics.

# vmstat –d
This option is used to get disk statistics.

== See also ==
- nmon — a system monitor tool for the AIX and Linux operating systems.
- iostat
- top
- sar
