= Ps (Unix) =

Standard UNIX utility that displays the currently-running processes

ps
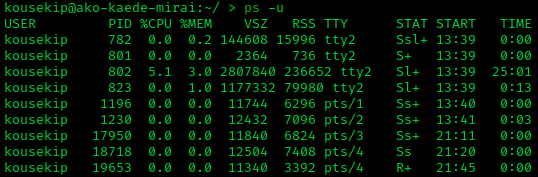
- The ps command
- Original author: AT&T Bell Laboratories
- Developers: Various open-source and commercial developers
- Initial release: February 1973; 53 years ago
- Written in: C
- Operating system: Unix, Unix-like, Plan 9, Inferno, KolibriOS, IBM i
- Platform: Cross-platform
- Type: Command
- License: Plan 9: MIT License

In most Unix and Unix-like operating systems, the ps (process status) program displays the currently-running processes. The related Unix utility top provides a real-time view of the running processes.

== Implementations ==
KolibriOS includes an implementation of the ps command. The ps command has also been ported to the IBM i operating system. In Windows PowerShell, ps is a predefined command alias for the Get-Process cmdlet, which essentially serves the same purpose.

== Examples ==
# ps
  PID TTY          TIME CMD
 7431 pts/0    00:00:00 su
 7434 pts/0    00:00:00 bash
18585 pts/0    00:00:00 ps

Users can pipeline ps with other commands, such as less to view the process status output one page at a time:

$ ps -A | less

Users can also utilize the ps command in conjunction with the grep command (see the pgrep and pkill commands) to find information about a single process, such as its id:

$ # Trying to find the PID of `firefox-bin` which is 2701
$ ps -A | grep firefox-bin
2701 ?        22:16:04 firefox-bin

The use of pgrep simplifies the syntax and avoids potential race conditions:

$ pgrep -l firefox-bin
2701 firefox-bin

To see every process running as root in user format:

# ps -U root -u
USER   PID  %CPU %MEM    VSZ   RSS TT  STAT STARTED        TIME COMMAND
root     1   0.0  0.0   9436   128  -  ILs  Sun00AM     0:00.12 /sbin/init --

== Header line ==
Column Header	Contents
%CPU	How much of the CPU the process is using
%MEM	How much memory the process is using
ADDR	Memory address of the process
C or CP	CPU usage and scheduling information
COMMAND*	Name of the process, including arguments, if any
NI	nice value
F	Flags
PID	Process ID number
PPID	ID number of the process's parent process
PRI	Priority of the process
RSS	Resident set size
S or STAT	Process status code
START or STIME	Time when the process started
VSZ	Virtual memory usage
TIME	The amount of CPU time used by the process
TT or TTY	Terminal associated with the process
UID or USER	Username of the process's owner
WCHAN	Memory address of the event the process is waiting for

* = Often abbreviated

== Options ==
ps has many options. On operating systems that support the SUS and POSIX standards, ps commonly runs with the options -ef, where "-e" selects every process and "-f" chooses the "full" output format. Another common option on these systems is -l, which specifies the "long" output format from X/Open System Interfaces (XSI), an optional extension to POSIX.

Most systems derived from BSD fail to accept the SUS and POSIX standard options because of historical conflicts. (For example, the "e" or "-e" option will display environment variables.) On such systems, ps commonly runs with the non-standard options aux, where "a" lists all processes on a terminal, including those of other users, "x" lists all processes without controlling terminals and "u" adds a column for the controlling user for each process. For maximum compatibility, there is no "-" in front of the "aux". "ps auxww" provides complete information about the process, including all parameters.

== See also ==
- Task manager
- kill (command)
- List of Unix commands
- nmon – a system monitor tool for AIX and Linux operating systems
- pstree (Unix)
- lsof
