= Bmon =

Bandwidth monitoring software

bmon
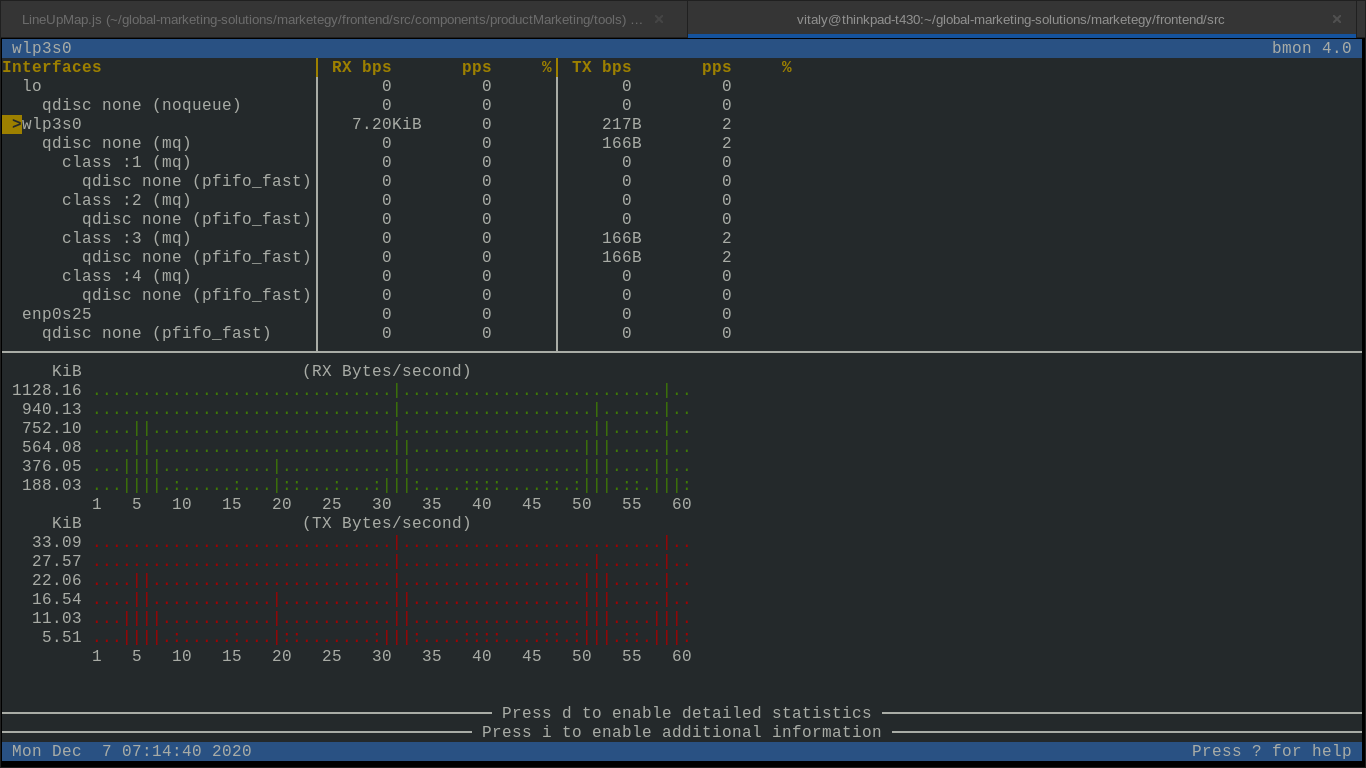
- Screenshot of bmon
- Developer: Thomas Graf
- Stable release: 5.0 / 15 September 2026; 16 days ago
- Written in: C
- Operating system: Linux and Unix-like
- License: BSD; MIT
- Website: jafaral.github.io/bmon/
- Repository: github.com/Jafaral/bmon

bmon is a free and open-source monitoring and debugging tool to monitor bandwidth and capture and display networking-related statistics. It features various output methods including an interactive curses user interface and programmable text output for scripting. bmon allows the user to see:

1. Network bandwidth real-time visualization
2. Total amount of transmitted data
3. CRC errors
4. Collisions
5. ICMPv6 traffic packets

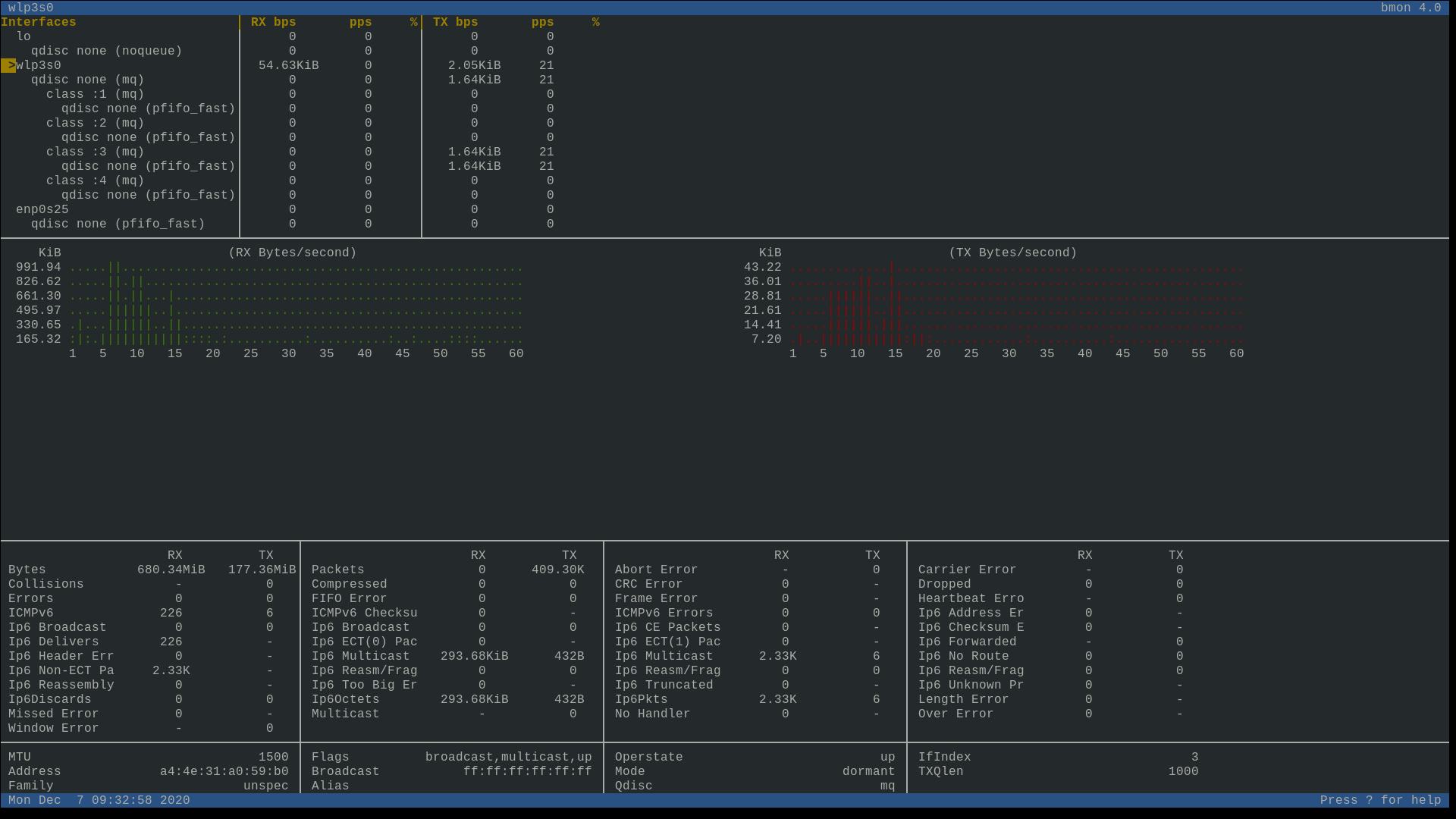
bmon with expanded panels
