= Htop =

Command line system monitor

htop
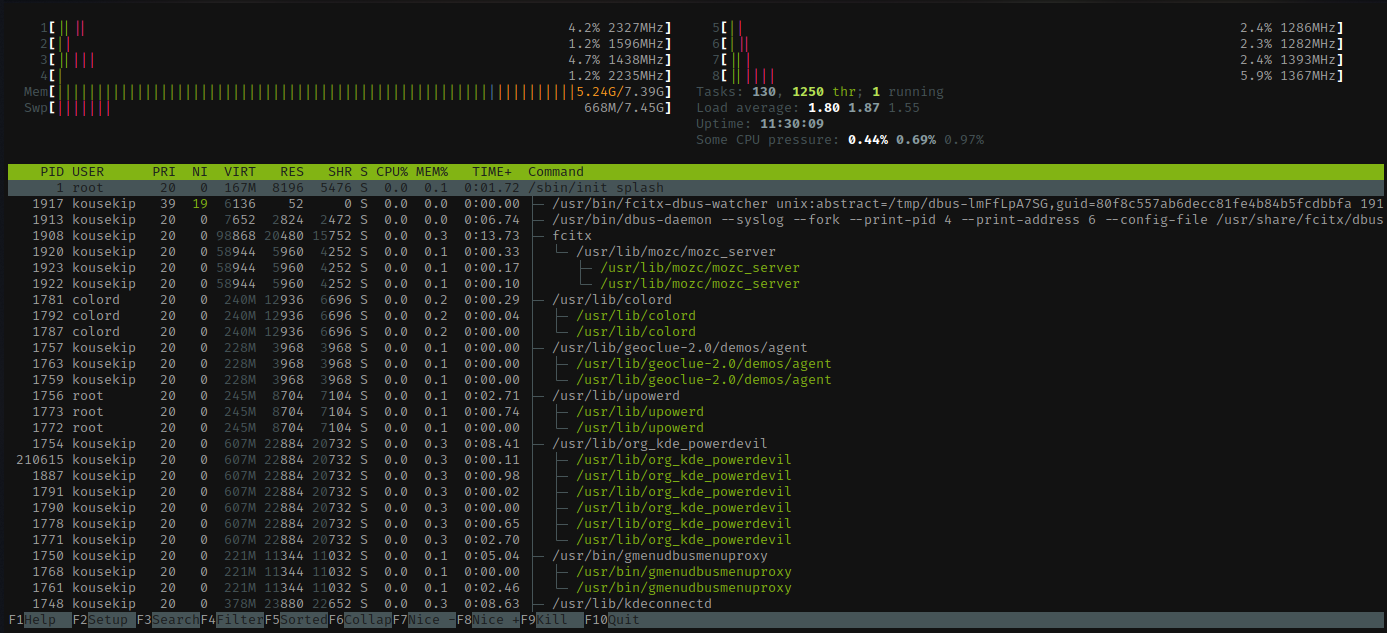
- Original author: Hisham Muhammad
- Developers: Hisham Muhammad (2004–2019) htop developer team (2020–present)
- Release: May 2004; 22 years ago
- Stable release: 3.5.3 / 16 August 2026; 46 days ago
- Written in: C (ncurses library)
- Operating system: Linux, macOS, FreeBSD, OpenBSD, Solaris, Illumos, OpenIndiana
- Type: Process Viewer / System monitor
- License: GPL-2.0-or-later
- Website: htop.dev
- Repository: github.com/htop-dev/htop

htop is an interactive system monitor process viewer and process manager. It is designed as an alternative to the Unix program top.

It shows a frequently updated list of the processes running on a computer, normally ordered by the amount of CPU usage. Unlike top, htop provides a full list of processes running, instead of the top resource-consuming processes. htop uses color and gives visual information about processor, swap and memory status. htop can also display the processes as a tree.

Users often deploy htop in cases where Unix top does not provide enough information about the system's processes. htop is also popularly used interactively as a system monitor. Compared to top, it provides a more convenient, visual, cursor-controlled interface for sending signals to processes.

htop is written in the C programming language using the ncurses library. Its name is derived from the original author's first name, as a nod to pinfo, an info-replacement program that does the same.

Because system monitoring interfaces are not standardized among Unix-like operating systems, much of htop's code must be rewritten for each operating system. Cross-platform, OpenBSD, FreeBSD and OS X (now macOS) support was added in htop 2.0. Solaris/Illumos/OpenIndiana support was added in 2.2.0.

htop was forked by several developers as htop-dev, and with support from the original author, the homepage was later redirected to a new domain.

== See also ==
- top (software)
- bmon, bandwidth monitoring
