= Quiet PC =

Type of personal computer

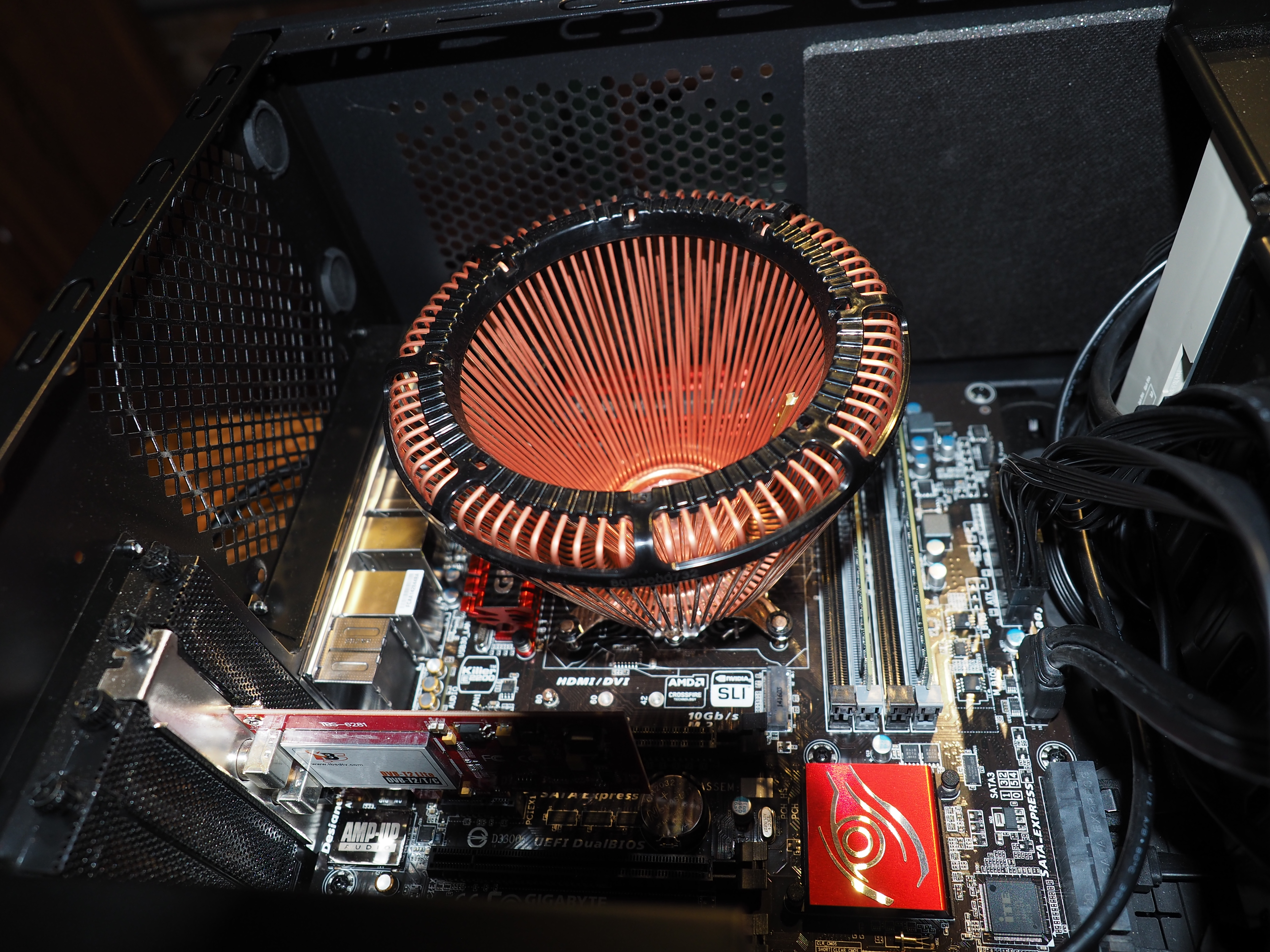
A fanless CPU cooler based on heat pipe technology

A quiet, silent or fanless PC is a personal computer that makes very little or no noise. Common uses for quiet PCs include video editing, sound mixing and home theater PCs, but noise reduction techniques can also be used to greatly reduce the noise from servers. There is currently no standard definition for a "quiet PC", and the term is generally not used in a business context, but by individuals and the businesses catering to them.

A proposed general definition is that the sound emitted by such PCs should not exceed 30 dB_{A}, but in addition to the average sound pressure level, the frequency spectrum and dynamics of the sound are important in determining if the sound of the computer is noticed. Sounds with a smooth frequency spectrum (lacking audible tonal peaks), and little temporal variation are less likely to be noticed. The character and amount of other noise in the environment also affects how much sound will be noticed or masked, so a computer may be quiet in relation to a particular environment or set of users.

== History ==
Energy Star, in 1992, and similar programs led to the widespread adoption of sleep mode among consumer electronics, and the TCO Certified program promoted lower energy consumption.

== Causes of noise ==
The main causes of PC noise are:

- Vibration from disk drives
- Air vortex effects from fan blade edges
- Electrical whine: noise generated by electrical coils or transformers used in power supplies, motherboards, video cards or LCD monitors.

== Measuring noise ==
Though standards do exist for measuring and reporting sound power output by such things as computer components, they are often ignored. Many manufacturers do not give sound power measurements. Some report sound pressure measurements, but those that do often do not specify how sound pressure measurements were taken. Even such basic information as measurement distance is rarely reported. Without knowing how it was measured, it is not possible to verify these claims, and comparisons between such measurements (e.g. for product selection) are meaningless. Comparative reviews, which test several devices under the same conditions, are more useful, but even then, an average sound pressure level is only one factor in determining which components will be perceived as quieter.

== Noise reduction methods ==
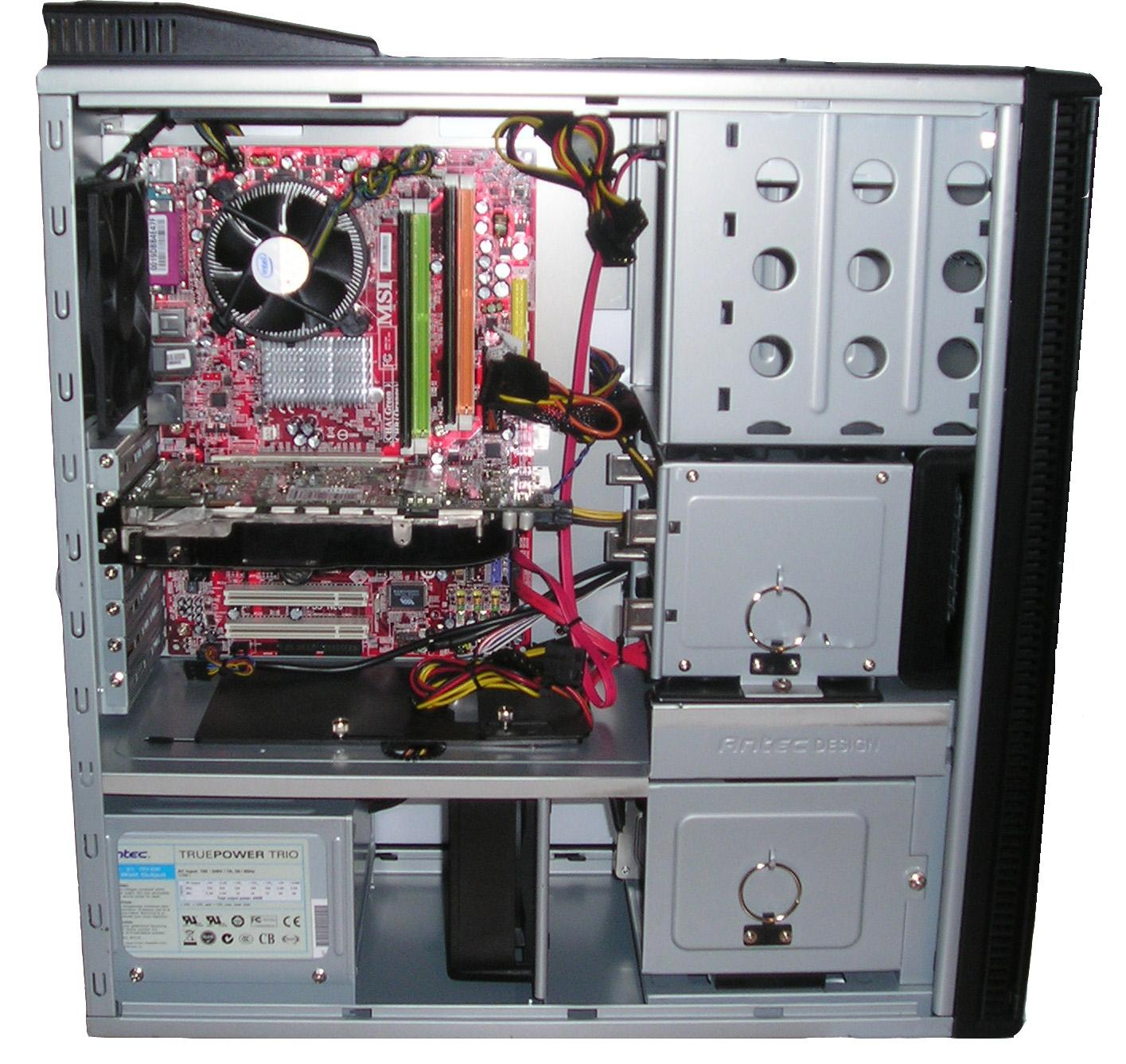
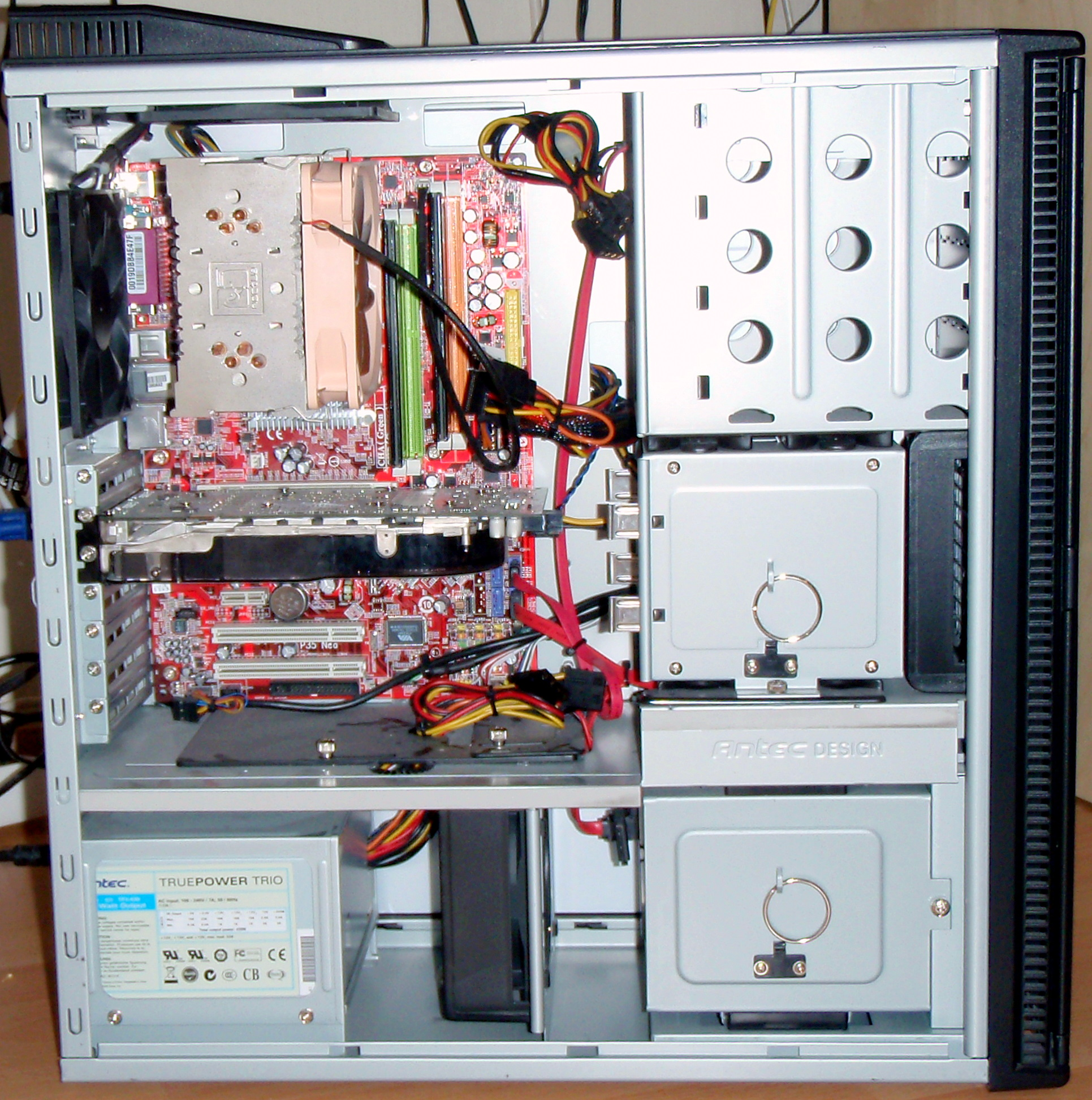
Reducing noise with new CPU cooler

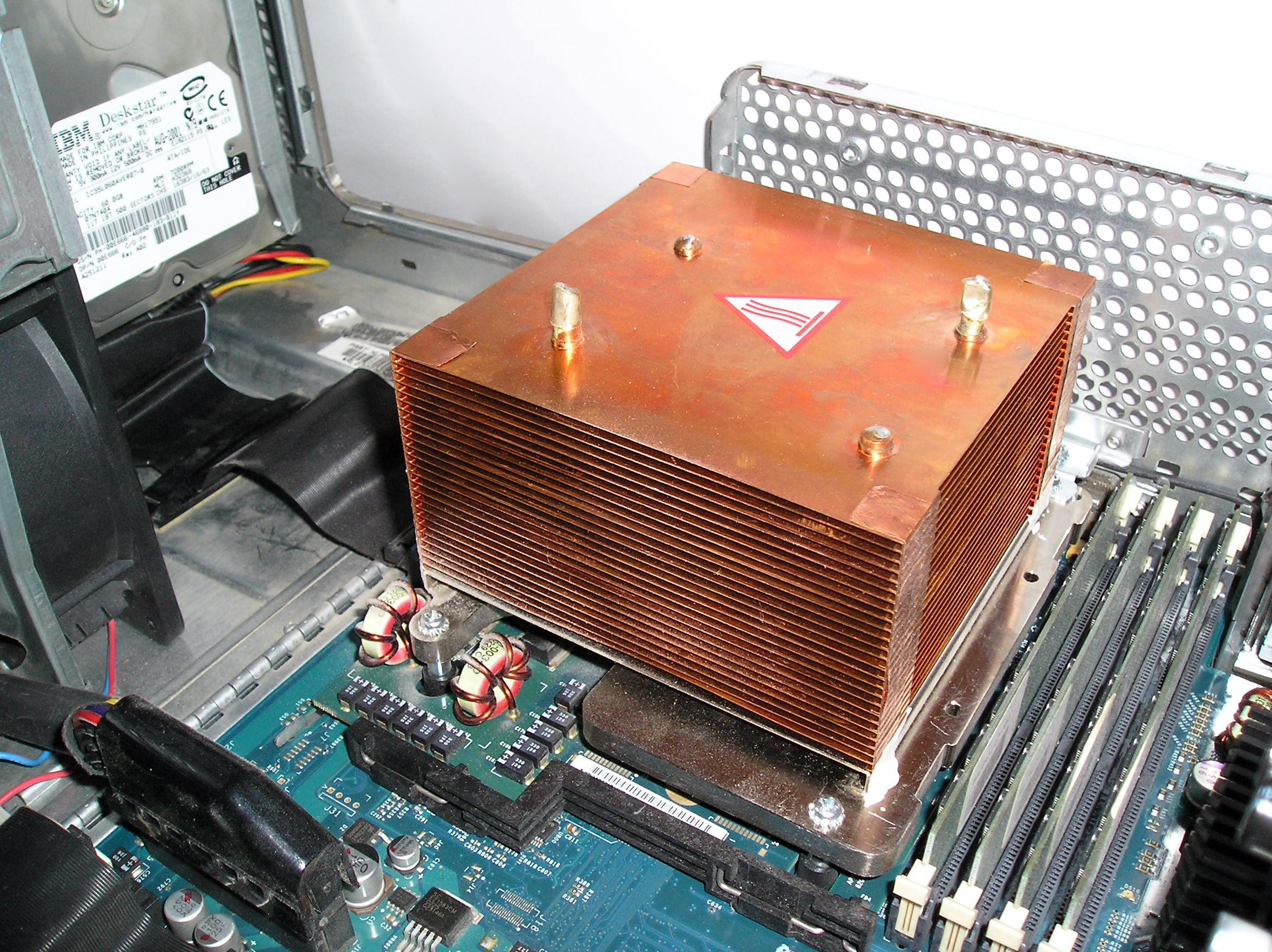
This passive heat sink in a Power Mac G4 relies on large surface areas.

=== Common noise reduction methods ===
- Use large, efficient heat sinks
- Incorporate heat pipes, which have much higher effective thermal conductivity than solid copper
- Use fans with lower speeds and larger diameters
- Use fans with low bearing and motor noise
- Rather than constant-speed fans, use thermostatically controlled variable-speed fans that run at less than maximum speed, and thus run quieter most of the time
- Use an efficient power supply to minimize waste heat
- Use quieter models of hard drive
- Use solid state devices like compact flash or solid-state drives rather than traditional mechanical hard drives
- Use remote networked via SMB or NFS rather than local disks
- Place a damping material such as Sorbothane around hard drives or other spinning items
- Use sound insulation material to absorb sound and dampen case resonance
- Water cooling, although difficult to set up, may be useful in some situations

=== Low-cost methods ===
A number of methods exist for reducing computer noise at little or no added cost.

- Reduce CPU supply voltage ("undervolting"). Many of today's CPUs can run stably at their stock speed, or even with a slight overclock, at a reduced voltage, which reduces heat output. Power consumption is approximately proportional to V^{2}·f, that is, it varies linearly with the clock frequency and quadratically with the voltage. This means that even a small reduction in voltage can have a large effect in power consumption. Undervolting and underclocking can also be used with chipsets and GPUs.
- Enable Cool'n'Quiet for AMD CPUs or SpeedStep (also known as EIST) on Intel CPUs.
- Reduce fan speed. For newer computers, the speed of fans can be varied automatically, depending on how hot certain parts of the computer get. Lowering a DC fan motor's supply voltage will reduce its speed while making it quieter and lowering the amount of air the fan moves. Doing this arbitrarily could lead to components overheating; therefore, whenever performing hardware work it is advised to monitor the temperature of system components. Fans with Molex connectors can be modified easily. With 3-pin fans, either fixed inline resistors or diodes, or commercial fan controllers can be used. Software like speedfan or Argus Monitor may allow fan speed control. Many newer motherboards support pulse-width modulation (PWM) control, allowing the fan speed to be set in the BIOS or with software.
- Mount fans on anti-vibration mounts.
- Remove restrictive fan grills to allow easier airflow, or replace noisy fan grills with quieter versions.
- Use software such as Nero DriveSpeed or RimhillEx to reduce the speed of optical drives.
- Isolate hard disk noise, either by using anti-vibration mounts (generally rubber or silicone grommets) or by suspending the hard disk to fully decouple it from the computer chassis by mounting it in a 5.25 inch drive bay with viscoelastic polymer mounts.
- Set the hard disk's AAM value to its lowest setting. This reduces the seek noise produced by the hard drive but also reduces performance slightly.
- Set operating system to spin down hard drives after a short time of inactivity. This may reduce a drive's life span and commonly conflicts with the OS and running programs, though it can still be useful for drives that are only used for data storage.
- Defragment hard drives to reduce the drive heads' need to search widely for data. This can also improve performance.
- Arrange components and cables to improve airflow. Wires hanging inside the computer can block the airflow, which can increase the temperature. They can be easily moved to the side of the case so that air can pass through more easily.
- Remove dust from inside the computer. Dust on computer parts will retain more heat. Fans draw in dust along with outside air; it can build up quickly inside the computer. Dust can be removed with a vacuum cleaner, gas duster, or compressed air. Special anti-static vacuum cleaners should be used, however, to prevent electrostatic discharge (ESD). Ideally, this would be done often enough to prevent a significant amount of dust from ever building up. How frequently this would need to be performed would depend entirely on the environment in which the computer is used.

In some cases an acceptable solution may be to relocate the too-noisy computer outside the immediate working area and access it either with long-distance HDMI/USB/DVI cables or via remote desktop software from a quiet thin client, e.g. based on a Raspberry Pi, a miniature computer that does not even use a heat sink.

== Individual components in a quiet PC ==
The following are notes regarding individual components in quiet PCs.

The motherboard, CPU, and video card are major energy users in a computer. Components that need less power will be easier to cool quietly. A quiet power supply is selected to be efficient while providing enough power for the computer.

=== Motherboard ===
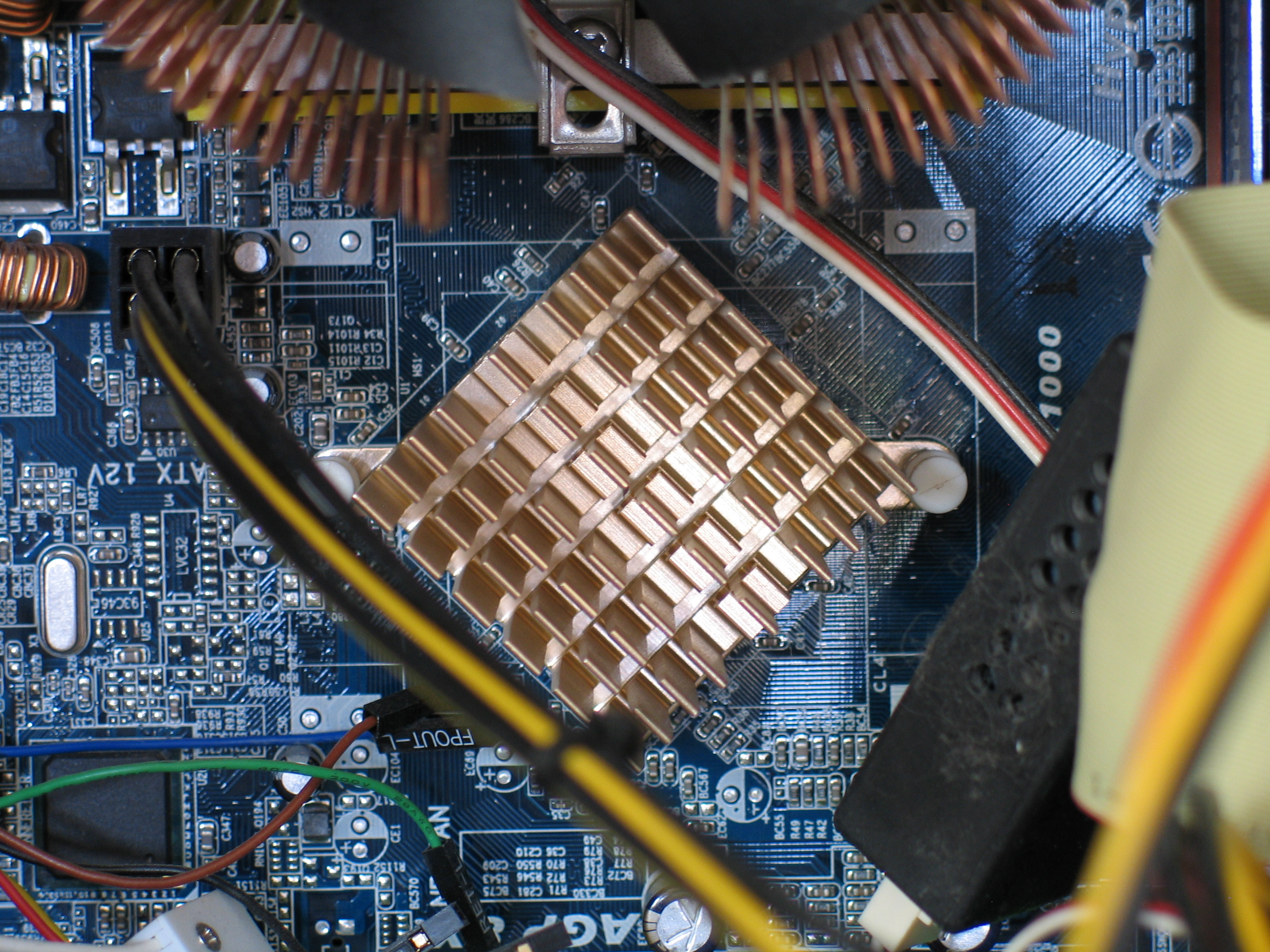
Passively cooled northbridge chipsets help reduce noise.

A motherboard based on a chipset that uses less energy will be easier to cool quietly. Undervolting and underclocking generally require motherboard support, but when available can be used to reduce energy use and heat output, and therefore cooling requirements.

Many modern motherboard chipsets have hot northbridges which may come with active cooling in the form of a small, noisy fan. Some motherboard manufacturers have replaced these fans by incorporating large heat sinks or heatpipe coolers, however they still require good case airflow to remove heat. Motherboard voltage regulators also often have heat sinks and may need airflow to ensure adequate cooling.

Some motherboards can control the fan speed using an integrated hardware monitoring chip (often a function within a Super I/O solution), which can be configured through BIOS or with a system monitoring software like SpeedFan and Argus Monitor, and most recent motherboards have built-in PWM fan control for one or two fans.

Even though a given hardware monitoring chip may be capable of performing fan control, a motherboard manufacturer may not necessarily wire up the fan header pins of the motherboard correctly to the hardware monitoring chip, thus sometimes computer fan control cannot be performed on a given motherboard due to the wiring irregularities, even though the software may indicate that the fan control is available due to the underlying support by the hardware monitoring chip itself. Other times, it may be the case that a single fan-control setting may affect all fan connector headers on the motherboard at the same time, even if individual settings for each fan are available in the hardware monitoring chip itself; these wiring issues being very common makes it difficult to design good general-purpose user interfaces for configuring fan control.

Motherboards can also produce audible electromagnetic noise.

=== CPU ===
The heat output of a CPU can vary according to its brand and model or, more precisely, its thermal design power (TDP). Intel's third revision Pentium 4, using the "Prescott" core, was infamous for being one of the hottest-running CPUs on the market. By comparison, AMD's Athlon series and the Intel Core 2 perform better at lower clock speeds and thus produce less heat.

Modern CPUs often incorporate energy saving systems, such as Cool'n'Quiet, LongHaul, and SpeedStep. These reduce the CPU clock speed and core voltage when the processor is idle, thus reducing heat. The heat produced by CPUs can be further reduced by undervolting, underclocking or both.

Most modern mainstream and value CPUs are made with a lower TDP to reduce heat, noise, and power consumption. Intel's dual-core Celeron, Pentium, and i3 CPUs generally have a TDP of 35–54 W, while the i5 and i7 are generally 64–84 W (newer versions, such as Haswell) or 95W (older versions, such as Sandy Bridge). Older CPUs such as the Core 2 Duo typically had a TDP of 65 W, while the Core 2 Quad CPUs were mostly 65–95 W. AMD's Athlon II x2 CPUs were 65 W, while the Athlon x4 was 95 W. The AMD Phenom ranged from 80 W in the x2 variant to 95 and 125 W in the quad-core variants. The AMD Bulldozer CPUs range from 95–125 W. AMD APUs range from 65 W for the lower-end dual-core variants, such as the A4, to 100 W in the higher-end quad-core variants, such as the A8. Some processors come in special low-power versions. For example, Intel's lower TDP CPUs end in T (35 W) or S (65 W).

=== Video card ===
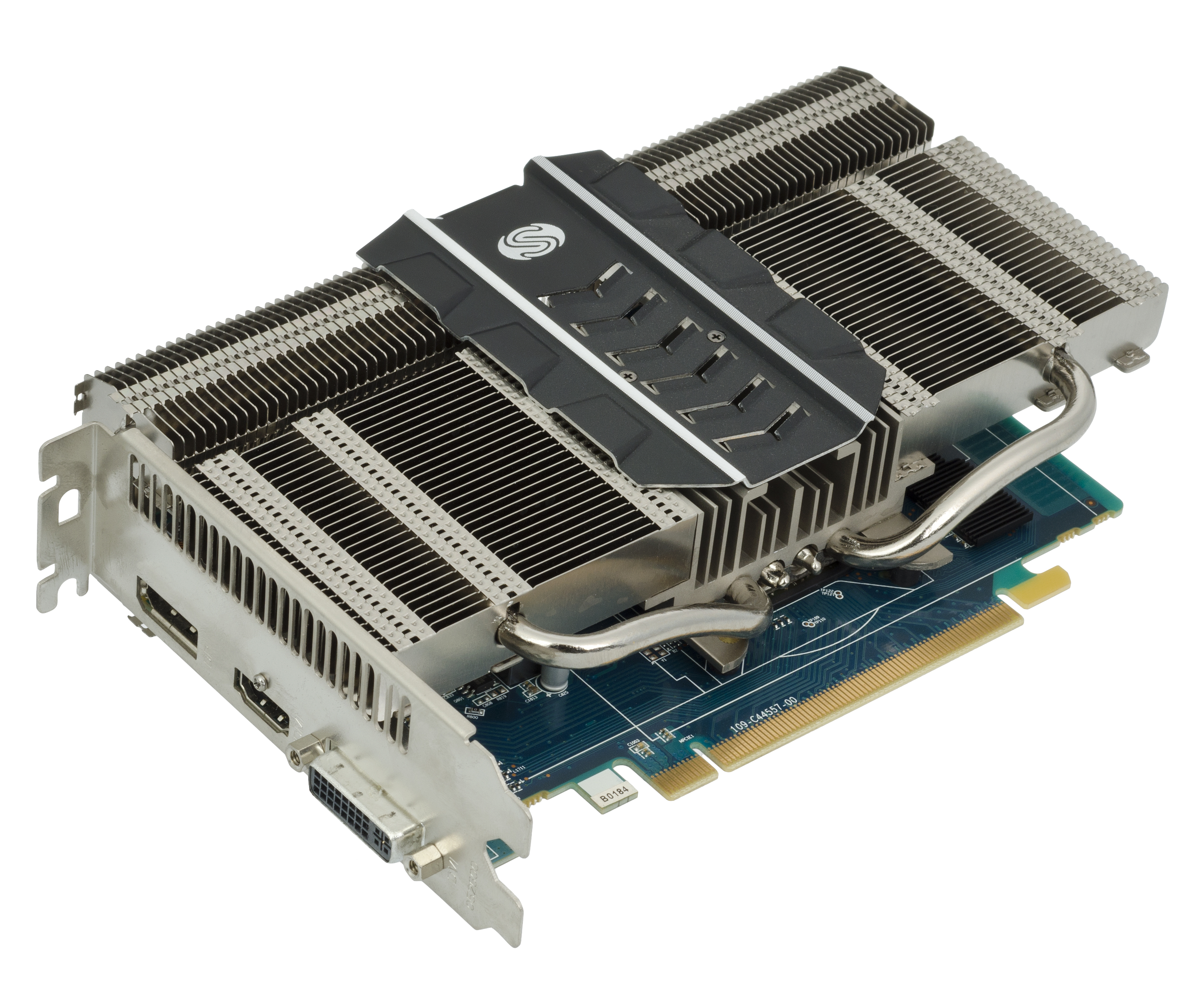
A video card using heat pipes for cooling and no dedicated fan

Video cards can produce a significant amount of heat. A fast GPU may be the largest power consumer in a computer and because of space limitations, video card coolers often use small fans running at high speeds, making them noisy.

Options to reduce noise from this source include:

- Replace the stock cooler with an aftermarket one.
- Use motherboard video output. Typically, motherboard video takes less power but provides lower gaming or HD video decoding performance.
- Select a video card that does not use a fan.
- Most modern graphics cards come with tools that allow the user to reduce the power target and adjust fan curves, resulting in quieter operation at the cost of performance

=== Power supply ===
Power supply (PSU) is made quieter through the use of higher efficiency (which reduces waste heat and need for airflow), quieter fans, more intelligent fan controllers (ones for which the correlation between temperature and fan speed is more complex than linear), more effective heat sinks, and designs that allow air to flow through with less resistance. For a given power supply size, more efficient supplies such as those certified 80 plus generate less heat.

A power supply of appropriate wattage for the computer is important for high efficiency and minimizing heat. Power supplies are typically less efficient when lightly or heavily loaded. High-wattage power supplies will typically be less efficient when lightly loaded, for instance when the computer is idle or sleeping. Most desktop computers spend most of their time lightly loaded. For example, most desktop PCs draw less than 250 watts at full load, and 200 watts or less is more typical.

Power supplies with thermally controlled fans can be made quieter by providing a cooler and/or less obstructed source of air, and fanless power supplies are available, either with large passive heat sinks or relying on convection or case airflow to dissipate heat. It is also possible to use fanless DC-to-DC power supplies that operate like those in laptops, using an external power brick to supply DC power, which is then converted to appropriate voltages and regulated for use by the computer. These power supplies usually have lower wattage ratings.

The electrical coils in power supplies can produce audible electromagnetic noise which can become noticeable in a quiet PC.

Equipping the PSU with a power cord that uses a ferrite bead can sometimes help to reduce humming from the PSU.

=== Case ===
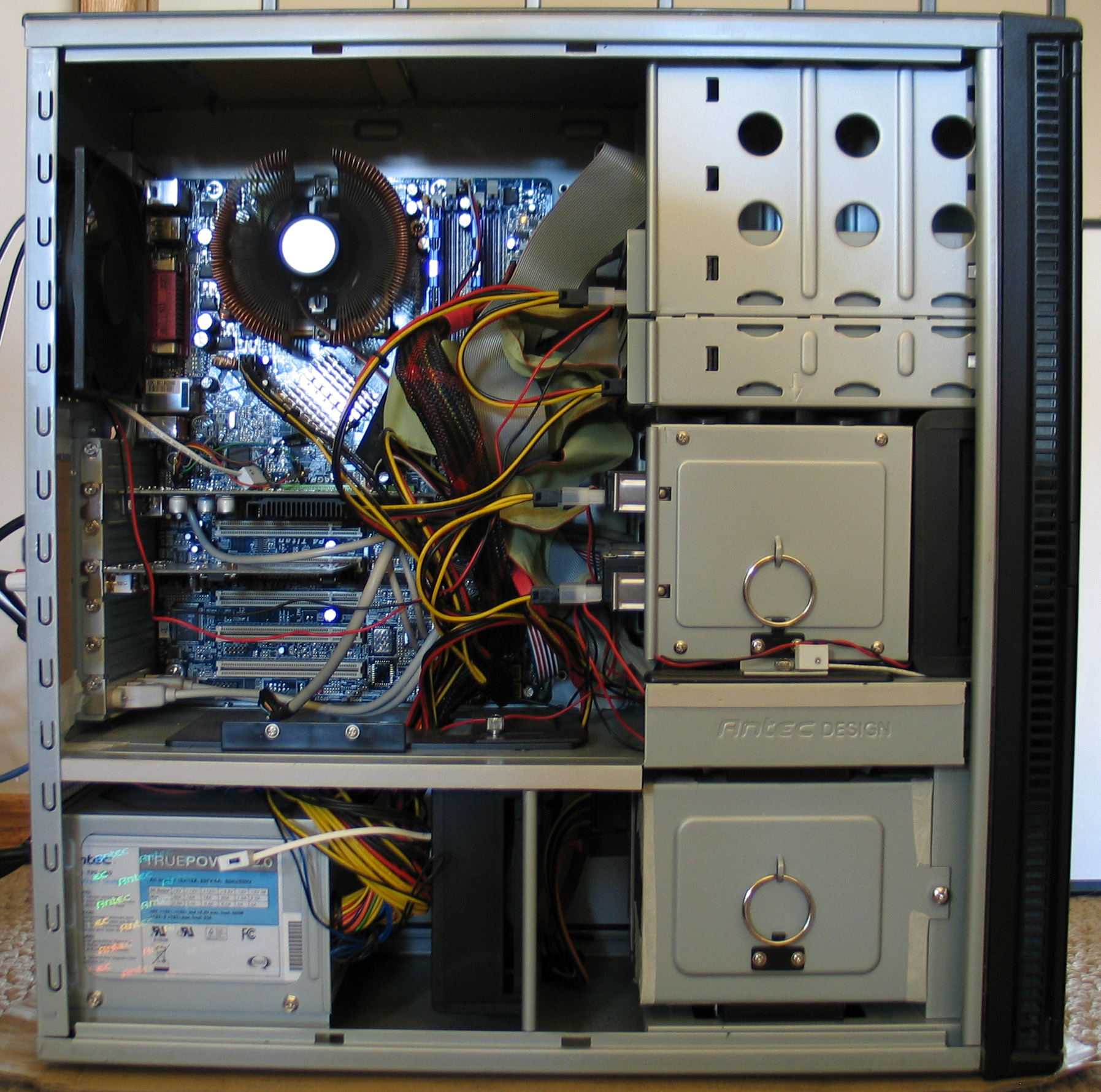
Antec P180, with isolated chambers for more segregated airflow

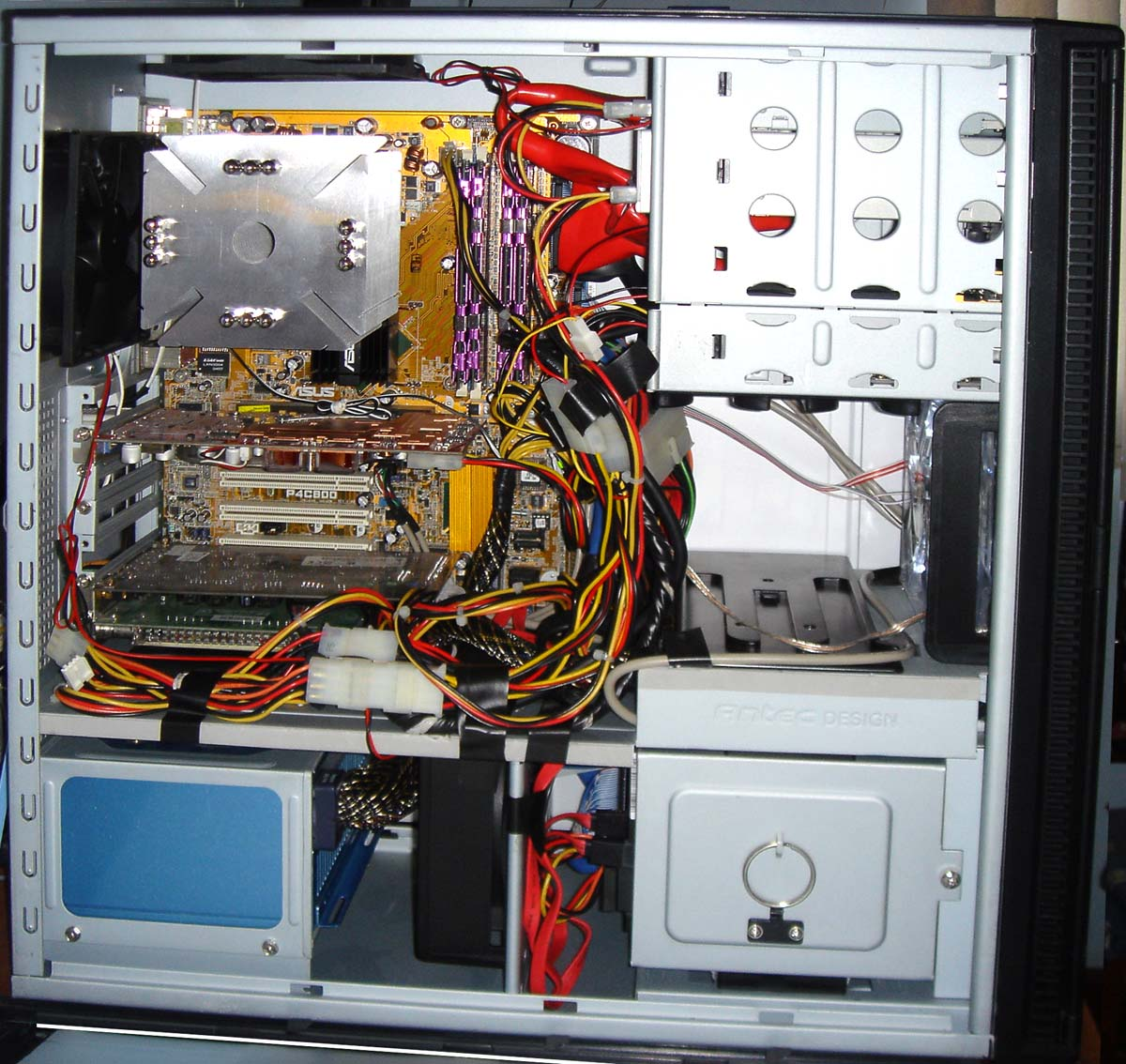
Another example of the Antec P180, this one demonstrating the use of the Scythe Ninja, a fanless CPU cooler

Case designed for low noise usually include quiet fans, and often come with a quiet power supply. Some incorporate heatsinks to cool components passively.

Larger cases provide more space for airflow, larger coolers and heat sinks, and sound-dampening material.

==== Airflow ====
Noise-optimized cases often have ducting and partitioning within the case to optimize airflow and to thermally isolate components. Vents and ducts may easily be added to regular cases.

Case designed to be quiet typically have wire grills or honeycombed fan grills. Both are far superior to the older style of stamped grill.

Features that facilitate neat cable management, such as brackets and space to run cables behind the motherboard tray, help increase cooling efficiency.

Air filters can help to prevent dust from coating heat sinks and surfaces, which dust impedes heat transfer, making fans spin faster. However, the filter itself can increase noise if it restricts airflow too much or is not kept clean, requiring a larger or faster fan to handle the pressure drop behind the filter.

==== Soundproofing ====
The inside of a case can be lined with dampening materials to reduce noise by:

- attenuating the vibration of the case panels via extensional damping or constrained-layer damping
- reducing the amplitude of the vibration of the case panels by increasing their mass
- absorbing airborne noise, such as with foam

=== Cooling systems ===
==== Heat sink ====
Large heat sinks designed to operate efficiently with little airflow are often used in quiet computers. Often heat pipes are used to more efficiently distribute heat to the heat sink.

==== Fan ====
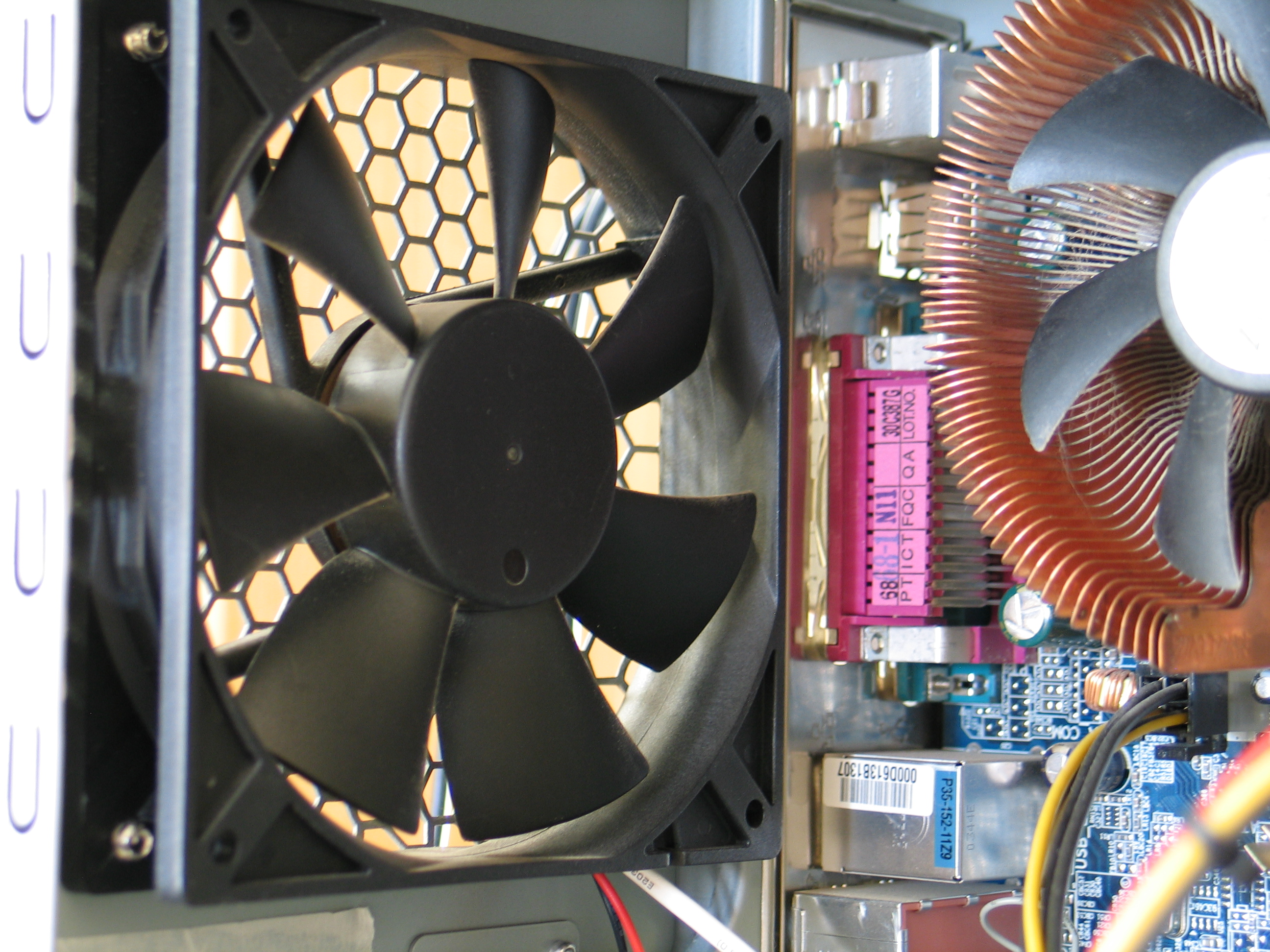
A 120 mm variable speed fan

If they use fans at all, quiet PCs typically use larger-than-usual low-speed fans with quiet-running motors and bearings. The 120 mm size is common, and 140 mm fans are used where cases or heat sinks allow them. Quiet fan manufacturers include Nexus, EBM-Papst, Yate Loon, Scythe, and Noctua. Extensive comparative surveys have been posted by SPCR and MadShrimps.

Fan noise is often proportional to fan speed, so fan controllers can be used to slow down fans and to precisely choose fan speed. Fan controllers can produce a fixed fan speed using an inline resistor or diode; or a variable speed using a potentiometer to supply a lower voltage. Fan speed can also be reduced more crudely by plugging them into the power supply's 5-volt line instead of the 12-volt line (or between the two for a potential difference of 7 volts, although this cripples the fan's speed sensing). Most fans will run at 5 volts once they are spinning, but may not start reliably at less than 7 V. Some simple fan controllers will only vary the fans' supply voltage between 8 V and 12 V to avoid this problem entirely. Some fan controllers start the fan at 12 V, then drop the voltage after a few seconds.

PWM fan control, however, is the easiest and most efficient option for modern motherboards that have PWM fan headers. PWM fan control rapidly cycles between feeding the fan full voltage and no voltage, to control rotational speed. Typically the motherboard chipset provides temperature data from sensors on the CPU itself to control speed.

Bearing and motor noise is an important consideration. Soft mounting fans (e.g. with rubber or silicone fan isolators) can help reduce transfer of fan vibration to other components.

Piezoelectric fans are often quieter than rotating fans and may consume less power.

==== Watercooling ====
Watercooling is a method of heat-dissipation by transferring the heat through a conductive material which is in contact with a liquid, such as demineralized water with an additive to prevent bacterial growth. This water travels in a loop that usually contains a reservoir, radiator and pump. Modern 12 V DC pump technologies allow extremely powerful and quiet designs.

By efficiently transferring device heat to a separate heat exchanger that can use larger heat sinks or fans, water cooling can allow quieter overall operation. Devices such as GPUs, Northbridges, Southbridges, hard disk drives, memory, voltage regulator modules (VRMs), and even power supplies can be separately watercooled; in fact the whole PC can be immersed, in some cases.

=== Secondary storage ===
==== Hard drive ====
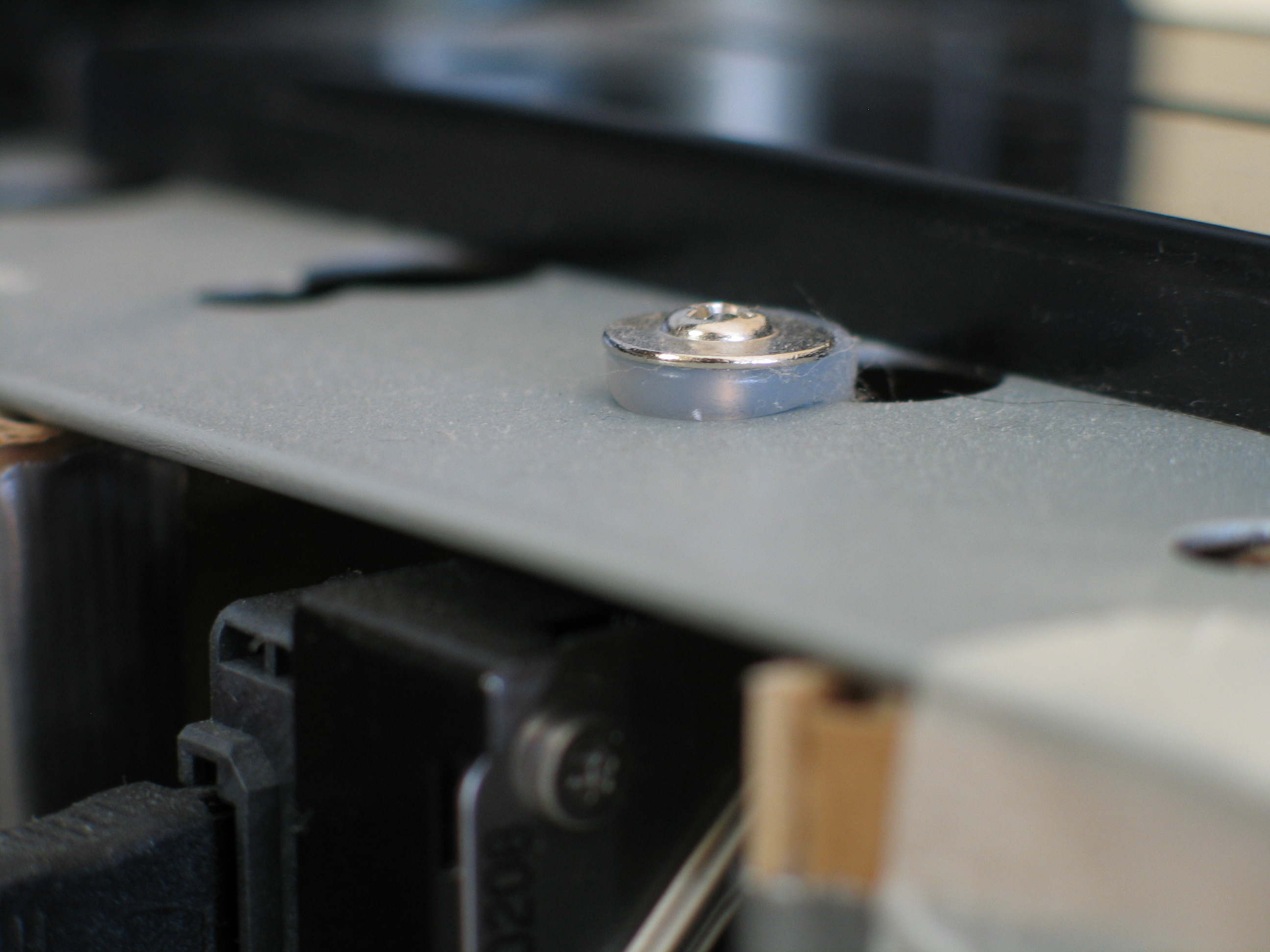
Silicone grommets in a computer case for mounting a hard drive to reduce vibration

Older hard drives used ball bearing motors but more recent desktop hard drives use quieter fluid bearing motors.

The smaller 2.5" form-factor hard drives generally vibrate less, are quieter, and use less power than traditional 3.5" drives, but often have lower performance and less capacity, and cost more per gigabyte.

To minimize vibrations from a hard drive being transferred to, and amplified by the case. Hard drives can be mounted with soft rubber studs, suspended with elastics, or placed on soft foam or Sorbothane. Hard disk enclosures can also help reduce drive noise, but care must be taken to ensure that the drive gets adequate cooling - with disk temperatures often monitored by SMART software.

==== Solid-state storage ====
A solid-state drive has no moving mechanical components and runs silently, but (as of 2016) are still roughly four times more expensive per unit of storage than consumer-grade HDDs.

In some cases, other solid-state storage methods may be suitable:

- Compact Flash (CF) cards can be used as secondary storage. Because they use a slightly modified Parallel ATA (PATA) interface, a simple adapter is all that is needed to connect CF cards to function as an PATA or PC Card hard disk. CF cards are also small, allowing SFF PCs to be made, produce no noise, use very little power (further reducing heat output in the AC/DC conversion in the PSU), and an insignificant amount of heat. However, they are very expensive per GB and are only available in small capacities and there are also issues regarding the maximum number of writes to each sector.
- USB flash drives can be used if a motherboard supports booting from USB. They are based on flash memory, so have the same advantages and disadvantages as CF cards, except that speed is limited by the USB bus.
- i-RAM is a solid-state disk that has four DIMM slots to allow regular PC RAM to be used like a disk. It is much faster than a hard disk, does not have the write cycle limitations of flash memory, however, it requires power continuously in order to maintain its contents (from standby power or a battery when the system is off), uses more power than many laptop hard drives, has maximum capacity of 4 GiB, and is expensive.

All forms of solid-state storage are more expensive than traditional spinning-disk drives, so some quiet PC designs use them in conjunction with a secondary hard drive which is only accessed when needed, or with network-attached storage, where less-quiet traditional hard drives are kept remote.

==== Optical drive ====
Optical drives can be slowed down by software to quiet them, such as Nero DriveSpeed, or emulated by virtual drive programs such as Daemon Tools to eliminate their noise entirely. Notebook optical drives can be used, which tend to be quieter, however, this may be because they tend to run slower (typically 24× CD speed, 8× DVD speed). Some DVD drives have a feature, commonly called Riplock, which reduces drive noise by slowing the drive during video playback. For playback operations, only 1x (real time) speed is required.

=== External components ===
==== Monitor ====
A CRT monitor can produce coil noise, as can the external power supply for an LCD monitor or the voltage converter for the monitor's backlight. LCD monitors tend to produce the least noise (whine) when at full brightness. Reducing brightness using the video card does not introduce whine but may reduce color accuracy. An LCD monitor with an external power supply tucked out of the way will produce less noticeable noise than one with the power supply built into the screen housing.

==== Printer ====
In the past, particularly noisy printers such as dot matrix and daisy wheel designs were often housed in soundproofed boxes or cabinets, and the same technique can be used with modern printers to reduce their perceived noise. Another solution is to network the printer and locate it physically away from the immediate work area.

== Laptop ==
In contrast to desktop PCs, laptops and notebooks typically do not have power supply fans or video card fans and generally use physically smaller hard drives and lower-power components. However, laptop CPU fans are usually smaller, so may not necessarily be quieter than their desktop counterparts - a smaller fan area requires faster fan speeds to move the same amount of air. Furthermore, limited space, limited access and proprietary components make silencing them more difficult.

=== Fanless ===
A number of laptops and netbooks however do not use cooling fans at all.

Fanless portable computers (tablet pcs, subnotebooks, chromebooks, ultrabooks and 2-in-1 PCs) running under 10-15 W on mobile CPUs (most commonly ARM processors) became popular after netbooks but then mainly after the introduction of the first iPad in 2010. The first iPad's CPU, the ARM Cortex-A8 was the first Cortex design to be adopted on a large scale in consumer devices.

== See also ==
- Keyboard computer
