= List of temperature sensors =

== Mechanical temperature sensors ==
- Thermometer
- Bimetallic strip

== Electrical temperature sensors ==
- Thermistor- Thermistors are thermally sensitive resistors whose prime function is to exhibit a large, predictable and precise change in electrical resistance when subjected to a corresponding change in body temperature. Negative Temperature Coefficient (NTC) thermistors exhibit a decrease in electrical resistance when subjected to an increase in body temperature and Positive Temperature Coefficient (PTC) thermistors exhibit an increase in electrical resistance when subjected to an increase in body temperature.
- Thermocouple
- Resistance thermometer
- Silicon bandgap temperature sensor

== Integrated circuit sensors ==
The integrated circuit sensor may come in a variety of interfaces — analogue or digital; for digital, these could be Serial Peripheral Interface, SMBus/I^{2}C or 1-Wire.

In OpenBSD, many of the I^{2}C temperature sensors from the below list have been supported and are accessible through the generalised hardware sensors framework since OpenBSD 3.9 (2006), which has also included an ad-hoc method of automatically scanning the I^{2}C bus by default during system boot since 2006 as well.

In NetBSD, many of these I^{2}C sensors are also supported and are accessible through the envsys framework, although none are enabled by default outside of Open Firmware architectures like macppc, and a manual configuration is required before first use on i386 or amd64.

Remote uncooled IR thermal radiometer sensors are also commonly used in integrated circuits.

== See also ==
- Celsius, Fahrenheit, Kelvin
- Conversion of units of temperature
- List of LM-series integrated circuits
- Temperature measurement
