= Envsys =

Hardware monitoring sensors framework

Environmental Systems framework (version 2)
- Original author: Juan Romero Pardines (2007)
- Developers: The NetBSD Foundation, Inc.
- Release: 1 July 2007; 19 years ago
- Written in: C
- Operating system: NetBSD since 5.0
- Type: system monitoring
- Licence: BSD licence#4-clause
- Website: envsys(4)
- Repository: /sys/sys/envsys.h

Environmental Systems API
- Original authors: Tim Rightnour and Bill Squier (2000)
- Developers: The NetBSD Foundation, Inc.
- Release: 15 December 1999; 26 years ago
- Final release: NetBSD 4.0.1 / 14 October 2008; 17 years ago
- Written in: C
- Operating system: NetBSD 1.5 to 4.0.1
- Type: system monitoring
- Licence: BSD licence#4-clause
- Website: envsys(4) in NetBSD 4.0
- Repository: /sys/sys/envsys.h

The envsys framework is a kernel-level hardware monitoring sensors framework in NetBSD. As of 4 March 2019, the framework is used by close to 85 device drivers to export various environmental monitoring sensors, as evidenced by references of the sysmon_envsys_register symbol within the sys path of NetBSD. With temperature sensors, ENVSYS_STEMP, being the most likely type to be exported by any given driver. Sensors are registered with the kernel through sysmon_envsys(9) API. Consumption and monitoring of sensors from the userland is performed with the help of envstat utility through proplib(3) through ioctl(2) against the /dev/sysmon pseudo-device file, the powerd power management daemon that responds to kernel events by running scripts from /etc/powerd/scripts/, as well as third-party tools like symon and GKrellM from pkgsrc.

== Features ==
The framework allows the user to amend the monitoring limits specified by the driver, and for the driver to perform monitoring of the sensors in kernel space, or even to program a hardware chip to do the monitoring for the system automatically. Two levels of limits are defined: critical and warning, both of which additionally extend to an over and an under categorisation. If limit thresholds are crossed, a kernel event may be generated, which can be caught in the userland by powerd to execute a pre-defined user script. By comparison, in OpenBSD's hw.sensors, the monitoring of user-defined values is performed in userspace by sensorsd.

As of 2019, the framework itself does not facilitate computer fan control, although the drivers could still implement interfacing with the fan-controlling capabilities of their chips through other means, for example, through a driver-specific sysctl interface, which is the approach taken by the dbcool(4) driver. However, the drivers for the most popular Super I/O chips like lm(4) and itesio(4) do not implement any fan control at all (in fact, historically, in all of OpenBSD, NetBSD and DragonFly, these drivers don't even report the duty cycle of the fans — only the actual RPM values are reported).

== History ==
The framework undergone two major revisions: the first version of envsys.h was committed on 15 December 1999; 26 years ago; with envsys.4 man page following on 27 February 2000; 26 years ago. Between 2000 and 2007, the manual page for envsys(4) in NetBSD stated that the "API is experimental", and that the "entire API should be replaced by a sysctl(8)", "should one be developed"; it can be noted that in 2003 this was the exact approach taken by OpenBSD with sysctl hw.sensors when some of the envsys(4) drivers were ported to OpenBSD.

The second revision came about on 1 July 2007; 19 years ago. The serialisation with userland was reimplemented using property lists with the help of NetBSD's new proplib(3) library (the underlying transport layer between the kernel and userland still being done through ioctl).

The envsys framework was the precursor to OpenBSD's sysctl hw.sensors framework in 2003, and many drivers, as well as some sensor types, have been ported back and forth between NetBSD and OpenBSD. Support for sensors of drive type has been added to NetBSD on 1 May 2007, similar to drive type in OpenBSD, which was at the same time when bio(4) and bioctl were ported from OpenBSD to NetBSD.

== See also ==
- bioctl
- hw.sensors
- lm_sensors
- SpeedFan
