= Lm sensors =

Software tool

lm_sensors
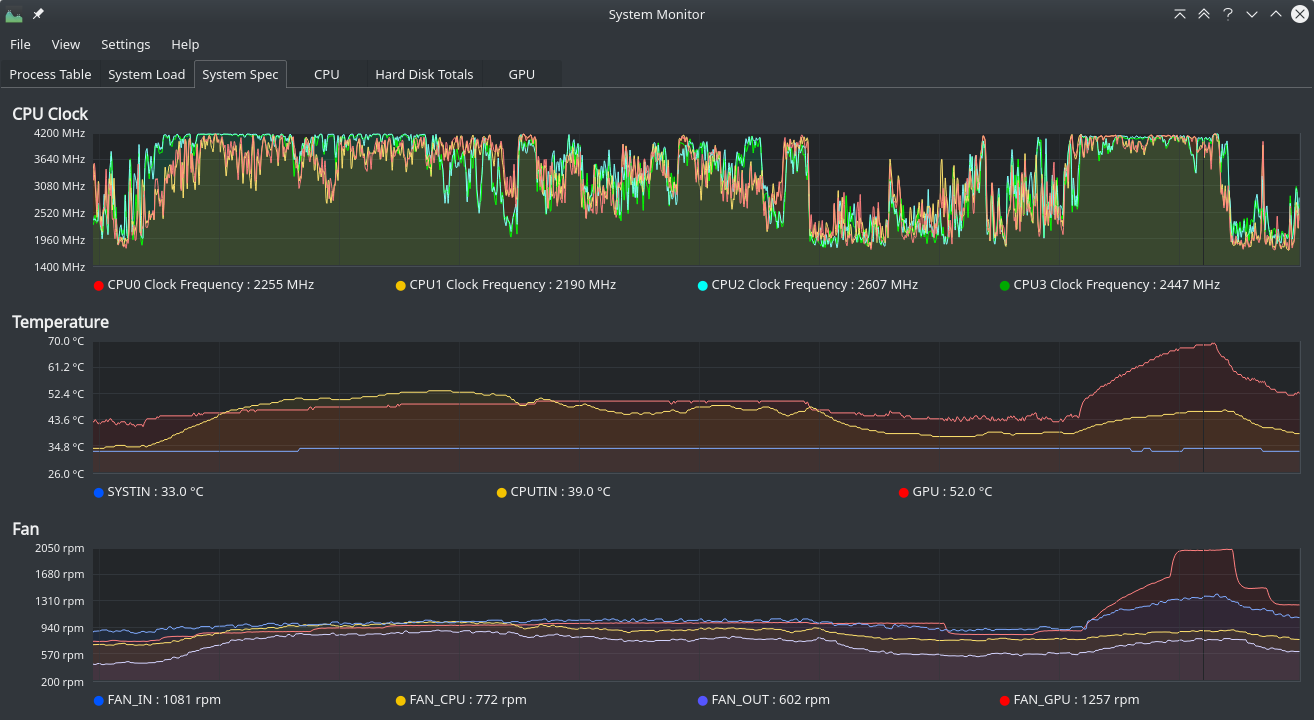
- KDE System Monitor, an lm_sensors frontend for KDE
- Stable release: 3.6.0 / October 17, 2019; 6 years ago
- Repository: github.com/lm-sensors/lm-sensors
- Written in: C
- Operating system: Linux
- Type: System monitoring
- License: GNU General Public License
- Website: hwmon.wiki.kernel.org

lm_sensors (Linux-monitoring sensors) is a free open-source software-tool for Linux that provides tools and drivers for monitoring temperatures, voltage, humidity, and fans. It can also detect chassis intrusions.

== Issues ==
During 2001/2004, the lm_sensors package was not recommended for use on IBM ThinkPads due to potential EEPROM corruption issues on some models when aggressively probing for I^{2}C devices. This has since been dealt with, and the separate README file dedicated to ThinkPads was removed in 2007.

In 2013, the sensors-detect command of lm-sensors began disrupting the gamma correction settings of some laptop display screens. This occurs while it is probing the I2C/SMBus adapters for connected hardware monitoring devices. Probing of these devices was disabled by default.

== See also ==
- Advanced Configuration and Power Interface (ACPI)
- Computer fan control
- Embedded Controller
- envsys on NetBSD
- hw.sensors on OpenBSD / DragonFly BSD
- I^{2}C
- Intelligent Platform Management Interface (IPMI)
- Super I/O
- System Management Bus (SMBus)
