= Daemontools =

Software

daemontools
- Original author: Daniel J. Bernstein
- Stable release: 0.76 / July 12, 2001; 25 years ago
- Written in: C
- Operating system: Linux, BSD, Unix
- Type: Init daemon
- License: Public domain software
- Website: cr.yp.to/daemontools.html

daemontools is a process supervision toolkit written by Daniel J. Bernstein as an alternative to other system initialization and process supervision tools, such as init.

Some of the features of daemontools are:

- Easy service installation and removal
- Easy first-time service startup
- Reliable restarts
- Easy, reliable signalling
- Clean process state
- Portability

Similar applications are runit, s6, and daemontools-encore.
