= Super I/O =

Class of I/O controller integrated circuits

Diagram of a motherboard, which supports many on-board peripheral functions as well as several expansion slots.

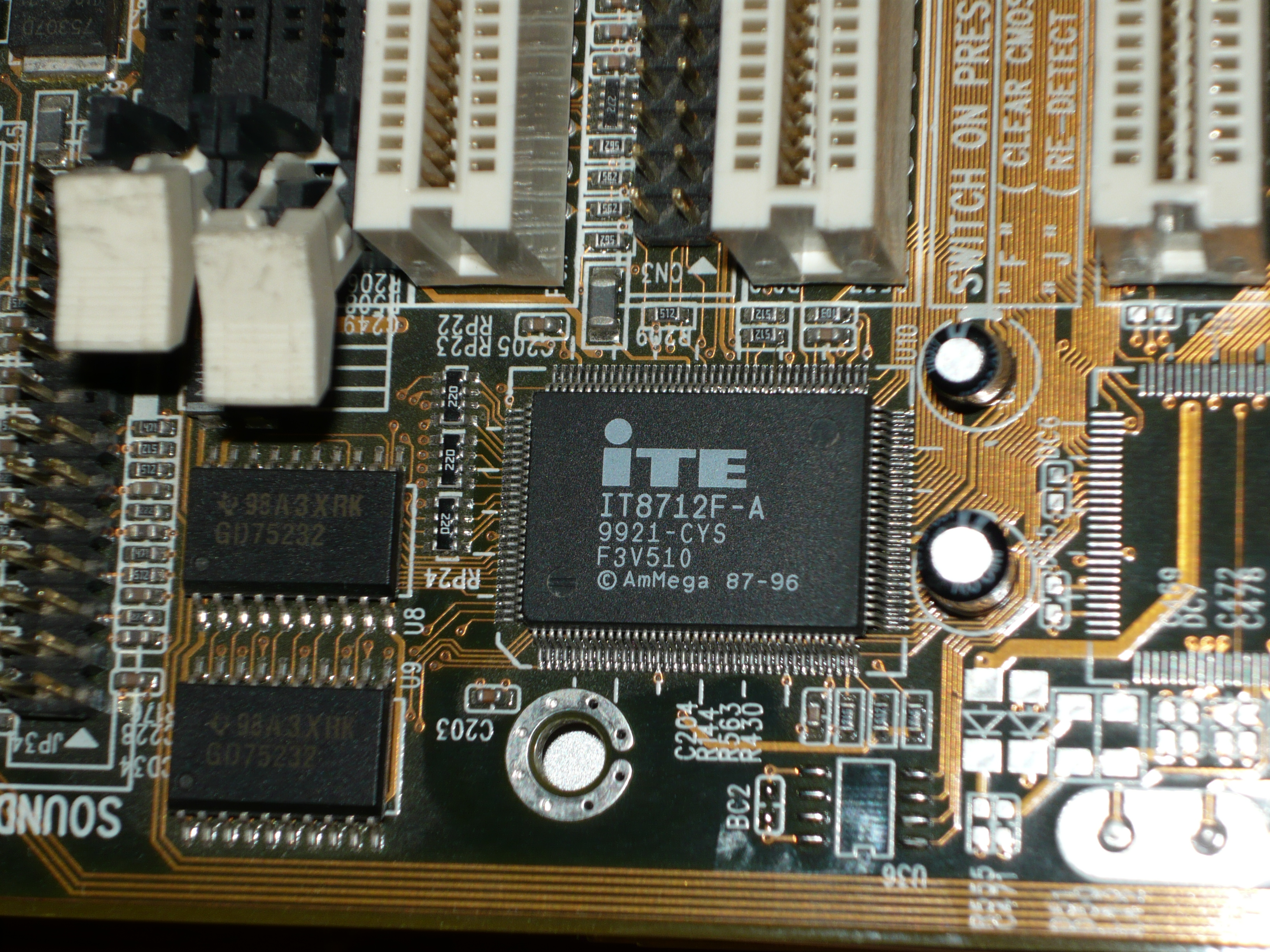
ITE Super I/O chip (IT8712F)

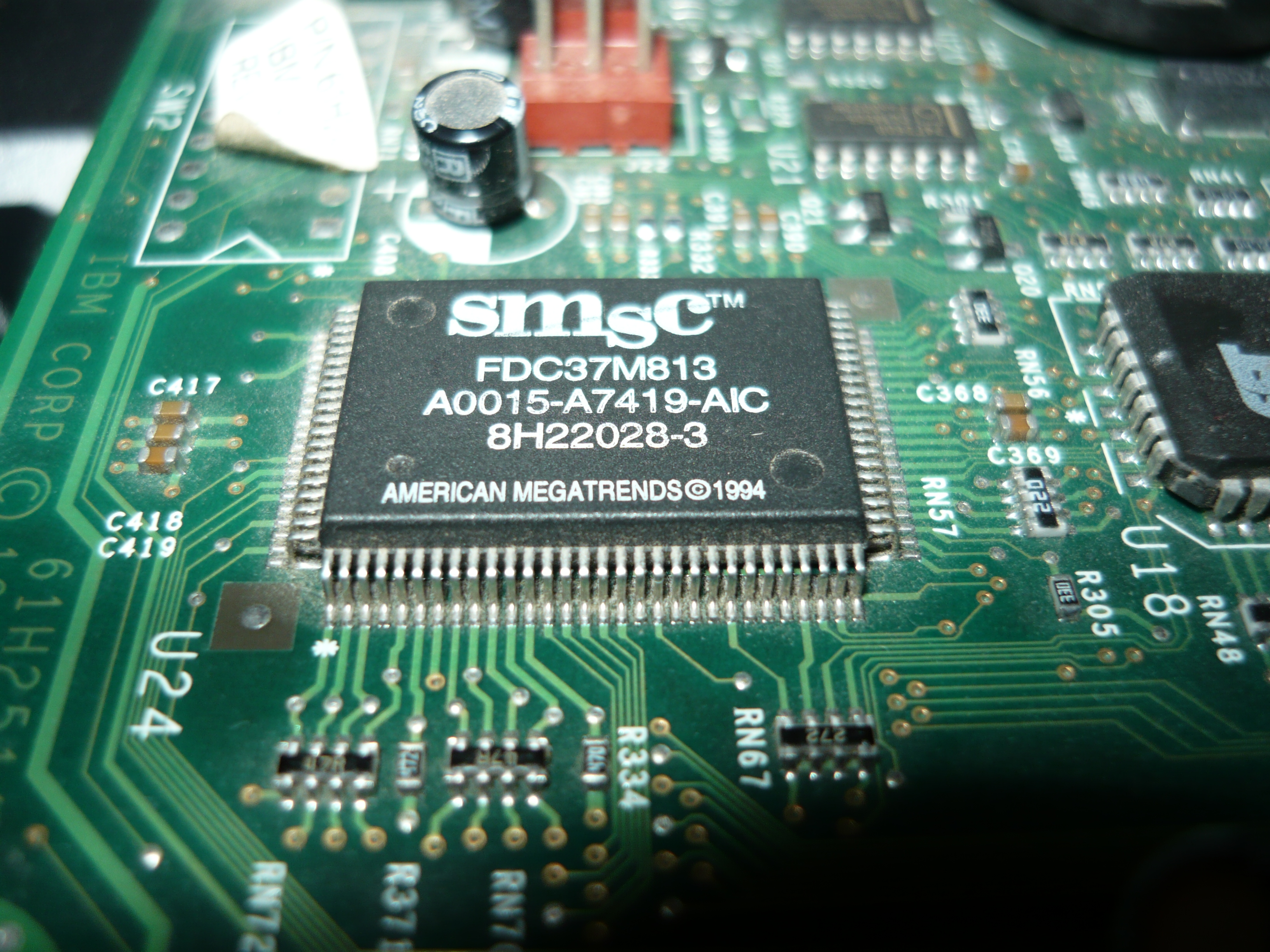
SMSC™ (now Microchip) Super I/O chip (FDC37M813) on IBM motherboard

Super I/O (sometimes Multi-IO) is a class of I/O controller integrated circuits that began to be used on personal computer motherboards in the late 1980s, originally as add-in cards, later embedded on the motherboards. A super I/O chip combines interfaces for a variety of low-bandwidth devices. Now the I/O controller that combined Super I/O function and Embedded Controller function is called embedded Super I/O (eSIO).

== Functions ==
The functions below are usually provided by the super I/O if the motherboard has these functions:

- A floppy-disk controller
- An IEEE 1284-compatible parallel port (commonly used for printers)
- One or more 16C550-compatible serial port UART's
- Keyboard controller for PS/2 keyboard and/or mouse

Most Super I/O chips include some additional low-speed devices, such as:

- Temperature, voltage, and fan speed interface
- Connect temperature and voltage sensors via SMBus
- Thermal Zone
- Chassis intrusion detection
- Mainboard power management, including control voltage regulator module
- LED management
- PWM fan speed control
- An IrDA Port controller
- A game port (not provided by recent super I/O chips because Windows XP is the last Windows OS to natively support game ports, requiring vendors to supply their own drivers for later Windows operating systems)
- A watchdog timer
- A consumer IR receiver
- A MIDI port
- Some GPIO pins
- Legacy Plug and Play or ACPI support for the included devices

By combining many functions in a single chip, the number of parts needed on a motherboard is reduced, thus reducing the cost of production.

== History ==
The original super I/O chips communicated with the central processing unit (CPU) via the ISA bus. With the evolution away from ISA towards use of the PCI bus, the Super I/O chip was often the biggest remaining reason for continuing inclusion of ISA on the motherboard.

Later super I/O chips use the LPC bus instead of ISA for communication with the central processing unit. This normally occurs through an LPC interface on the Southbridge chip of the motherboard.

Since Intel is replacing the LPC bus with the eSPI bus, super I/O chips that connect to that bus have appeared on the market.

Companies that make super I/O controllers include Nuvoton (spun off from Winbond), ITE Inc., Fintek Inc. ,ENE Tech. (for laptop) and Microchip Technology (which bought SMSC™). National Semiconductor used to make super I/O controllers but sold that business to Winbond at 2005, which already had a competing super I/O controller business. In 2008, Winbond then spun off its logic businesses to a wholly owned subsidiary, Nuvoton. SMSC made super I/O chips and then got acquired by Microchip Technology.

== Common models ==
=== ENE Tech. ===
Many models are used for laptops with built-in keyboard controllers

- KB3930
- KB930QF

=== ITE Inc. ===
- T8510E series

=== Microchip Technology (SMSC) ===
Microchip Technology provides Super I/O components with their SCH, MEC and LPC47 series. Here are some examples:

- SCH3112
- SCH3114
- SCH3116
- SCH3223

=== Nuvoton Technology (Winbond) ===
- NCT6776

== See also ==
- envsys
- hw.sensors
- lm_sensors contains a tool named sensors-detect that can also detect which Super I/O is used on a mainboard
- SpeedFan
- Embedded controller (EC)
