= Automatic acoustic management =

Technology to reduce hard drive seek noise

Automatic acoustic management (AAM) is a method for reducing acoustic emanations in AT Attachment (ATA) mass storage devices for computer data storage, such as ATA hard disk drives and ATAPI optical disc drives. AAM is an optional feature set for ATA/ATAPI devices; when a device supports AAM, the acoustic management parameters are adjustable through a software or firmware user interface.

== Details ==
The ATA/ATAPI sub-command for setting the level of AAM operation is an 8-bit value from 0 to 255. Most modern drives ship with the vendor-defined value of 0x00 in the acoustic management setting. This often translates to the max-performance value of 254 stated in the standard. Values between 128 and 254 (0x80 – 0xFE) enable the feature and select most-quiet to most-performance settings along that range. Though hard drive manufacturers may support the whole range of values, the settings are allowed to be banded, so many values could provide the same acoustic performance.

Although there is no definition of the function implemented to provide acoustic management in the ATA standard, most drives use power control of the head-positioning servo to reduce vibration induced by the head positioning mechanism. Western Digital calls this IntelliSeek™ which uses only enough head acceleration to position the head at the target track and sector "just in time" to access data. Previous seek mechanisms used maximum power and acceleration to position the head. This operation induced the familiar clicking vibration emanating from a seeking hard drive. Western Digital provides a demonstration flash movie illustrating just-in-time head positioning on their web site.

To provide best acoustic performance, some drive manufacturers may limit the maximum seek velocity of the heads for AAM operation. This degrades performance by increasing the average seek time: some head movements are forced to wait an additional disk rotation before accessing data because the head was unable to move to the target position during the first rotation due to velocity limits. For example, benchmark tests with SiSoftware Sandra Lite on a Samsung HD154UI (1.5TB, SATA300, 3.5", 5400rpm, 32MB Cache) hard drive showed no measurable performance impact for an AAM setting of 190, but the drive did become noticeably more quiet than the disabled setting (0). Selecting the most-quiet setting (128) caused average random access time to increase about 10% while quieting improved noticeably over the middle setting. On this drive, some quieting is available without performance impact, and even more quieting is available if some performance degradation is acceptable.

AAM operates independently of advanced power management settings. However, selecting lower head acceleration (quieter operation) uses less power, so energy-conscious users might prefer the most-quiet setting (128) for power management purposes.

== History ==
INCITS (formerly NCITS) first standardized AAM in the ATA/ATAPI-6 specification.

AAM is no longer available for Seagate and Western Digital drives. In 2008, Seagate removed AAM capabilities from all its drives because Convolve alleged that one of its patents, US Patent No. 6,314,473 covers AAM technology. Western Digital began doing the same in 2011, without making any official announcements, nor updating their product documentation. The product specification sheets continue to claim (in March 2012) that there are different seek modes on their drives. However the hardware that is now manufactured does not allow control over AAM.

== See also ==
- Device configuration overlay
- International Committee for Information Technology Standards
- Quiet PC
- Self-Monitoring, Analysis, and Reporting Technology
