= Monit =

Process supervision tool for Unix and Linux

- Developer: Tildeslash Ltd
- Stable release: 5.34.0 / May 29, 2024; 23 months ago
- Written in: C
- Available in: English
- Type: Process supervision
- License: AGPL 3.0
- Website: mmonit.com/monit/
- Repository: bitbucket.org/tildeslash/monit

Monit is a free, open-source process supervision tool for Unix and Linux. With Monit, system status can be viewed directly from the command line, or via the native HTTP(S) web server. Monit is able to do automatic maintenance, repair, and run meaningful causal actions in error situations. Monit rose to popularity with Ruby on Rails and the Mongrel web server, because a tool was needed that could manage the many identical Mongrel processes that needed to be run to support a scalable Ruby on Rails site, and Monit was fairly uniquely suited for the needs of the Ruby on Rails community. Many popular Rails sites have used Monit, including Twitter and Scribd.

Monit can restart a process automatically if the process dies or monitor process characteristics, such as memory or CPU cycles, and alert by email or execute an action.

Additionally, M/Monit can monitor and manage distributed computer systems, M/Monit uses Monit as an agent and can manage and monitor. M/Monit is proprietary software.
