= GKrellM =

System monitor software

- A typical GKrellM window.
- Developers: Bill Wilson, Stefan Gehn
- Stable release: 2.5.0 / December 14, 2025; 2 months ago
- Written in: GTK+
- Operating system: Unix-like
- Type: System monitor
- License: GNU General Public License
- Website: gkrellm.srcbox.net

GNU Krell Monitors (GKrellM) is a computer system monitor package based on the GTK+ toolkit that creates a single process stack of system monitors. It can be used to monitor the status of CPUs, main memory, hard disks, network interfaces, local and remote mailboxes, and many other things. Plugins are available for a multitude of tasks, e.g., controlling the XMMS media player or a SETI@home client from within the stacked monitor.

Released under the terms of the GNU General Public License, GKrellM is free software.

== See also ==
- Task manager
- System monitor
- Conky (software)
