= SpeedFan =

System monitoring tool

- SpeedFan 4.44 in Windows 7
- Original author: Alfredo Milani Comparetti
- Developer: Alfredo Milani Comparetti
- Initial release: 27 March 2001; 24 years ago
- Stable release: 4.52 (29 June 2016; 9 years ago) [±]
- Preview release: 4.51 beta 2 (7 August 2014; 11 years ago) [±]
- Written in: Delphi, C++, C
- Operating system: Windows 95 and later
- Type: System monitor
- License: Freeware
- Website: www.almico.com/speedfan.php

SpeedFan is a system monitor for Microsoft Windows that can read temperatures, voltages and fan speeds of computer components. It can change computer fan speeds depending on the temperature of various components. The program can display system variables as charts and as an indicator in the system tray. Fully configurable user events can be defined to execute specific actions based on system status

== Hard disk support ==
SpeedFan also monitors S.M.A.R.T. readings for EIDE, SATA and SCSI hard disks. Starting with version 4.35, SpeedFan fully supports Areca RAID controllers. Version 4.38 added full support for AMCC/3ware SATA and RAID controllers.

== Hard disk in-depth online analysis ==
SpeedFan offers a feature named "in-depth online analysis" that compares the hard disk's S.M.A.R.T. data to a database with statistical models of hard disks allowing early detection of potentially degraded hard disks. Messages inform the user of specific situations and problems, which Almico says is “as if a human expert had looked at the data”.

== Reception ==
An extended review of version 4.46 in 2012 on the Silent PC Review website summarized, "The biggest drawback [to Speedfan] is it often takes a lot of work to properly configure", but continued, "Its highly customizable and incredibly powerful nature is unmatched by the competition and as a bonus, it's also free, lightweight and regularly updated with more features and better motherboard support." The Softonic review of version 4.49 graded SpeedFan 8/10, listing it as useful, with "helpful charts to monitor performance and health", but noting that it requests administrator rights at launch, and "Can be intimidating for less tech savvy".

== See also ==
- Argus Monitor
- Motherboard Monitor
- System monitor
- Comparison of S.M.A.R.T. tools
- lm_sensors
- hw.sensors
