= RAID levels =

RAID levels are the possible configurations of a RAID disk array. RAID is an acronym for redundant array of independent disks (originally redundant array of inexpensive disks). Different RAID levels define how data is distributed across multiple storage devices and whether techniques such as data striping, disk mirroring, or parity are used to provide increased performance, storage capacity, or fault tolerance.

The term "RAID level" does not imply a hierarchy of performance or reliability. The numerical designations primarily identify different data layouts and redundancy schemes. Standard RAID levels are defined by the Storage Networking Industry Association (SNIA) in the Common RAID Disk Drive Format (DDF) standard, while numerous nested and non-standard implementations have also been developed.

== Standard RAID levels ==
Standard RAID levels are the basic RAID configurations defined in the Common RAID Disk Drive Format standard. The principal levels are RAID 0, RAID 1, RAID 2, RAID 3, RAID 4, RAID 5, and RAID 6.

The standard levels differ in how they distribute data and redundancy among the drives:

RAID 0 uses block-level striping without mirroring or parity. It provides high aggregate performance and uses all available disk capacity for data, but provides no fault tolerance. RAID 1 uses disk mirroring, maintaining identical copies of data on multiple drives. The array can continue operating after the failure of a drive, provided that at least one mirror remains available. RAID 2 uses bit-level striping together with dedicated Hamming code error-correction information. It was rarely implemented in practice and is largely obsolete. RAID 3 uses byte-level striping with a dedicated parity drive. It was designed for high-throughput workloads but is rarely used in modern systems. RAID 4 uses block-level striping with a dedicated parity drive. Its dedicated parity disk can become a performance bottleneck for write-intensive workloads. RAID 5 uses block-level striping with distributed parity. Parity information is distributed among the drives rather than stored on a single dedicated drive, allowing the array to tolerate the failure of one drive. RAID 6 uses block-level striping with double distributed parity. It can tolerate the simultaneous failure of two drives and generally requires at least four drives.

The capacity available for user data, performance characteristics, and fault tolerance vary substantially between these configurations. RAID 0, for example, provides no redundancy, whereas RAID 1, RAID 5, and RAID 6 use redundancy to allow continued operation after one or more drive failures.

== Nested RAID levels ==
Nested RAID levels, also known as hybrid RAID, combine two or more standard RAID levels. They are commonly identified by concatenating the numbers of the constituent levels. For example, RAID 10 combines RAID 1 mirroring with RAID 0 striping, while RAID 50 combines RAID 5 with RAID 0.

Common nested configurations include:

RAID 01 (RAID 0+1) RAID 10 (RAID 1+0) RAID 50 (RAID 5+0) RAID 60 (RAID 6+0) RAID 100 (RAID 10+0)

The order of the levels is significant. In particular, RAID 01 and RAID 10 have different layouts and different failure characteristics despite using the same two underlying RAID levels.

== Non-standard RAID levels ==
Non-standard RAID levels are RAID configurations that differ substantially from the standard configurations defined by the SNIA. They include proprietary implementations as well as variants developed by hardware manufacturers, operating-system projects, and storage vendors.

Examples include RAID-DP and variants such as RAID 5E, RAID 5EE, and RAID 6E. Some of these configurations modify the placement of parity or integrate a spare drive into the array's data layout.

Because non-standard RAID levels may use different data layouts and recovery mechanisms, their names do not necessarily imply identical behavior across different implementations.

== See also ==
RAID Standard RAID levels Nested RAID levels Non-standard RAID levels Non-RAID drive architectures
