= IT8212 =

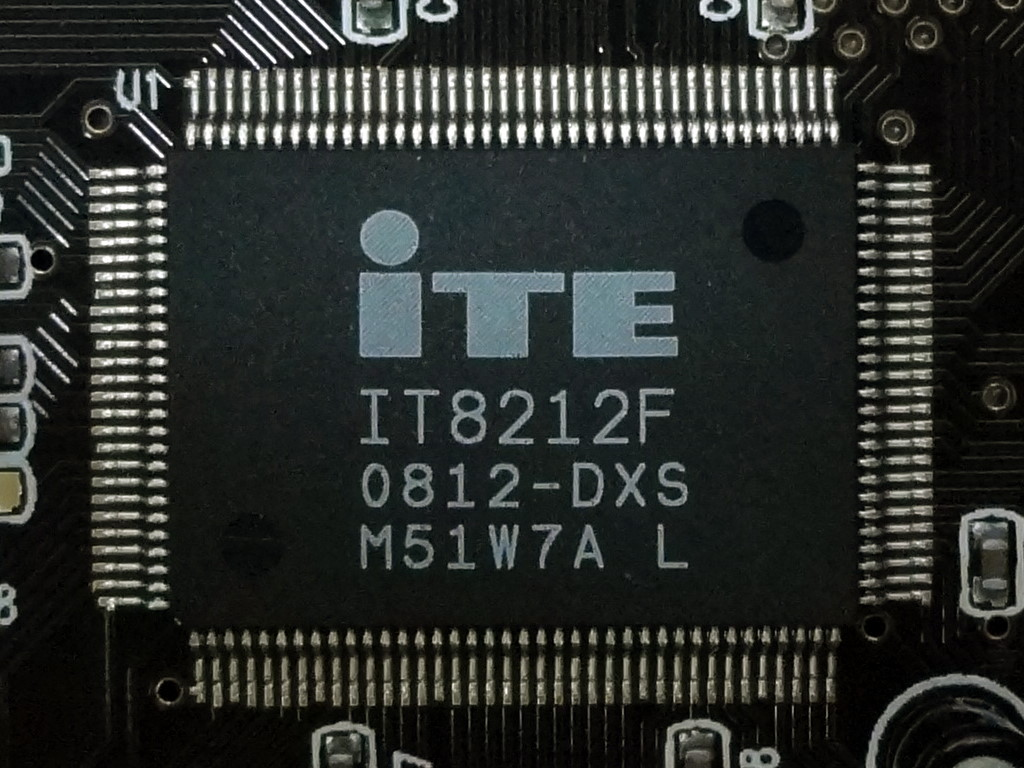
ITE IT8212F 0812-DXS

The IT8212, or more correctly the IT8212F, is a low-end Parallel ATA controller designed by ITE Tech. Depending on the implemented BIOS and configuration the IT8212F functions in either a RAID or an ATAPI mode, supporting up to four devices using dual channels. The raid mode only supports IDE Hard Disk Drives and includes RAID 0, RAID 1, Raid 0+1 and JBOD, along with a "normal" mode that essentially acts as a standard Hard Disk controller. Optical disk drives such as CD-ROM and DVD drives are supported by the ATAPI mode, which also supports Hard Disk Drives at the loss of all RAID functions. RAID functions are implemented by an embedded microprocessor, thus is not a so-called "Soft raid" controller.

Devices based on ITE's IT8212F fall into two distinct forms: add-on cards, and components embedded into the motherboards of personal computers. ITE make neither of these end products, instead selling either the controller or manufacture rights, along with reference designs, to third parties for use in their end products. Different implementations have significant incompatibilities, requiring BIOS updates and/or converting from one feature set to another in driver code, causing inconvenience to users.

The controller's BIOS is normally stored in a dedicated on-board Flash Memory Device, except that when the controller is integrated into a motherboard its BIOS and the motherboard's BIOS are often combined into one. Upgrading the BIOS can be difficult at best. Some controllers have one-time programmable memory chips, which cannot be altered at all. Others use devices not supported by ITE's BIOS-flashing utility, though some users have reported success with the utility Uniflash. The BIOS cannot be configured for both RAID and ATAPI functioning at once, so users may be prevented by a manufacturer's decision from changing between these modes.

The IT8212F is, according to ITE's Preliminary Specification V0.3, compliant with the ATAPI-6 specification, supporting transfer modes PIO modes 0,1,2,3 and 4, DMA modes 0,1 and 2 along with UDMA modes 0,1,2,3,4,5 and 6. It also supports the PCI 2.2 specification.

As of 2005, the IT8212 is used in low-end RAID cards, such as this CompUSA PATA RAID Card.

IT8212F IDE Controller Product Page
