= RAID processing unit =

A RAID processing unit (RPU) is an integrated circuit that performs specialized calculations in a RAID host adapter.

XOR calculations, for example, are necessary for calculating parity data, and for maintaining data integrity when writing to a disk array that uses a parity drive or data striping. An RPU may perform these calculations more efficiently than the computer's central processing unit (CPU).
