= Geom raid5 =

Storage module for FreeBSD operating system

geom_raid5 is a storage module created for the FreeBSD operating system. It facilitates RAID5 functionality without the need of a hardware RAID controller.

geom_raid5 allows storage of large amounts of data to be protected against disk failure, while providing good throughput performance. Like other FreeBSD storage modules, geom_raid5 utilizes the GEOM framework. It is built as a kernel loadable module (KLD) which allows it to run inside the FreeBSD kernel. The module can be compiled on FreeBSD release 5 and newer releases. geom_raid5 is also incorporated into FreeNAS, an operating system dedicated to Network Attached Storage. Its author, Arne Woerner, has released the software under the BSD license, making geom_raid5 OSI-compliant open source software.

== Comparing to other Software RAID5 solutions ==
geom_raid5 distinguishes itself by providing both advanced features and high performance. While the theoretical maximum write speed is speed of slowest disk × (number of disks - 1), the latest version is able to achieve about 80% of that theoretical maximum. This is in huge contrast with other software RAID5 solutions which sometimes achieve less than 10% of that throughput combined with significantly higher CPU utilization.

The reason for this huge difference lies in geom_raid5's design. In order to write data to a RAID5 volume, data must often first be read in order to calculate the parity information that protects against data loss in case of a single disk failure. Using request combining a full stripe block can be 'collected' so a read is no longer required. This means the harddrive heads do not need to change position every time but can write data contiguously, theoretically at full speed.

Of course, this only works with sequential transfers and sometimes even then the filesystem does not write contiguously. But using request combining, geom_raid5 manages to outperform any software RAID5 solution to date, capable of reaching write-speeds associated with hardware RAID5 on budget-level x86 hardware.

Currently the module is being finalized. When a stable version is released the author will release further information about its design and disclose benchmarks. In particular, benchmarks showing geom_raid5 performance versus ZFS's RAID-Z are long-awaited by users.

== Variants ==
Various incarnations of geom raid5 exist which trade off speed for memory usage.

- geom_raid5

The most stable version but slower than the other variants in certain cases

- geom_raid5 TNG

Uses more memory to deliver better transfer rates

- geom_raid5 PP

Memory usage and speed is in between the TNG and PP. Uses less memory than TNG but is slower. Uses more memory than the original geom_raid5 driver and is faster. It is also claimed that PP's code best being the cleanest of the three
