= ITE =

ITE or Ite may refer to:

== Places ==
- Ite (village), Walloon name of the Belgian village of Ittre
- Ite District in Tacna Region, Peru

== Brands and enterprises ==
- Interactive Television Entertainment, a defunct Danish media company
- ITE Tech, a company that produces the IT8212 Parallel ATA controller

== Computing and technology ==
- If-then-else, conditional expressions in computer programming
- In-the-ear (ITE) hearing aids
- Information technology equipment (ITE)
- Integrated Transcription Environment, a class of transcription software

== Organizations ==
- Institute of Technical Education (Singapore)
- Institute of Transportation Engineers
- L’Internationale des Travailleurs de l’Enseignement, a predecessor organization of the World Federation of Teachers Unions (FISE)

== Science ==
- "Ité", another name for the Moriche Palm (Mauritia flexuosa)
- -ite, a suffix for a chemical name of a molecule with one less oxygen atom than an "-ate" molecule

== Other uses ==
- Inherit the Earth (ITE), a video game
- -ite, a suffix meaning member of or resident of, e.g., New Jerseyite
