= DDF =

DDF may refer to:

== Biology and medicine ==
- Digestive Disorders Foundation, a British medical research charity
- (N,N-dimethyl-amino)-benzenediazonium-fluoroborate, a photoaffinity probe that competes with acetylcholine for receptor binding
- Sulfoxone, an anti-leprosy drug sold under "DDF" brand

== Technology ==
- Digital distribution frame, a device which terminates digital data streams, allowing arbitrary interconnections to be made
- 4,4'-Dinitro-3,3'-diazenofuroxan, an experimental high explosive
- Disk Data Format, a structure describing how data is formatted across disks in a RAID group

== Ecology and conservation ==
- Deciduous Dipterocarp Forest or Dry Deciduous Forest, also known as dry broadleaf forest, a type of dipterocarp forest found in tropical and subtropical latitudes, particularly India and mainland Southeast Asia.

== Other uses ==
- DanDoesFooty, an AFL podcast launched in 2024 by Dan Gorringe
- Demographic Development Fund, Georgian think tank
- Dicastery for the Doctrine of the Faith, a Rome-based Catholic institution
- Drop Dead Fred, a 1991 fantasy comedy film
- Dubai Duty Free, a duty-free retailer
