= RPU =

RPU may refer to:

- RAID processing unit, chip used for RAID calculations
- Radio Processing Unit (Baseband processor), for digital radio connectivity
- Ray Processing Unit, component of ray-tracing hardware
- Refrigerant Pumping Unit
- Remote pickup unit, a radio link used to send program content such as news reporting to a broadcast center
- Reprocessed uranium
- Revenue per unit
- Right of perpetual usufruct, public ground lease in Poland
- Rigid Polyurethane, a type of plastic
- Roads Policing Unit, the motorway and trunk-road police unit of a British police force
