= Geom =

Geom may refer to:

- Geom, a Korean sword
- GEOM, a modular disk framework used in FreeBSD 5.0 and newer
- An abbreviation of geometry
- The God-Emperor of Mankind, a core character in the Warhammer 40,000 fictional universe
