= Parity drive =

A parity drive is a hard drive used in a RAID array to provide fault tolerance. For example, RAID 3 uses a parity drive to create a system that is both fault tolerant and, because of data striping, fast. Basically, a single data bit is added to the end of a data block to ensure the number of bits in the message is either odd or even.

One way to implement a parity drive in a RAID array is to use the exclusive or, or XOR, function. XOR is a Boolean logic function which means 'one or the other, but not both'. The XOR of all of the data drives in the RAID array is written to the parity drive. If one of the data drives fails, the XOR of the remaining drives is identical to the data of the lost drive. Therefore, when a drive is lost, recovering the drive is as simple as copying the XOR of the remaining drives to a fresh data drive.
