= Intel Rapid Storage Technology =

Computer storage-device driver

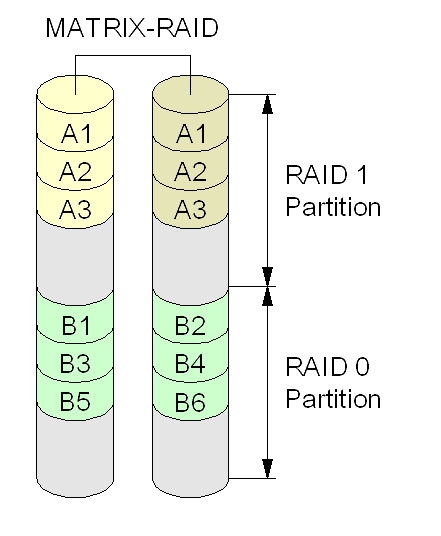
Diagram of an Intel RST setup

Intel Rapid Storage Technology (RST) is a SATA AHCI driver and a firmware-based RAID solution built into a wide range of Intel chipsets. Currently, it is also installed as a driver for Intel Optane temporary storage units.

It contains two operation modes that follow two Intel specific modes rather than the SATA standard. The name modes and the application that contains them have been renamed since the first version. Until 2010 it contained AHCI and Matrix RAID modes. The first mode is the Intel driver SATA normal and the latter mode is a fake RAID. Up to version 4 it was included on Intel Application Accelerator RAID Edition, between versions 5 and 8.9 it was included on Intel Matrix Storage Manager (IMSM), since version 9 it is included on Intel Rapid Storage Technology (IRST) preferring the driver modes to be named RST AHCI and RST AHCI RAID instead of Matrix RAID. The latter is also known as RST RAID mode, since it is the mode that Intel recommends. The purpose of the program, after installing the drivers, is to configure the operation in this mode.

Both modes work with SATA drives. The boot mode choice, with one mode or the other, is chosen in modern BIOS/UEFI after driver installation. Once one or the other driver is installed, it is not possible for the Microsoft Windows operating system to boot again with the BIOS/UEFI set to RAID/IDE, producing BSOD in case of trying.

As of 2020, it includes a RAID system capable of RAID levels 0, 1, 5, and 10, a block level SSD caching accelerator ("Smart Response Technology") with support for write-back and write-through modes for speed or data protection of any disk or RAID array, and support for intelligent caching, speedy recovery from certain issues, and for PCI Express based drives. Intel RST came in two variants, RST for desktops, and RSTe for enterprise scenarios, although for many chipsets, the user could choose as both variants will operate correctly. VROC was a part of Intel RSTe. The SATA RAID portion of the product family was called Intel RSTe and the NVMe RAID portion was called Intel VROC. However, starting in Q1 2019, with the launch of Intel VROC 6.0, the Intel RSTe name was removed, and all RAID solutions in this product family were branded as Intel VROC. The SATA functionality remains, but is now branded as Intel VROC (SATA RAID). Intel RSTe is no longer a referenced product by Intel. The name may still appear in some legacy products, but all new references will solely use the Intel VROC nomenclature.

Intel RST is provided by a combination of firmware, chipset and CPU capabilities, and software. As such, the chipset, the firmware included in the BIOS, and the software installed by the user, must be compatible versions.

Like all RAID (Redundant Array of Independent Disks), Intel RST RAID employs two or more physical hard disks which the operating system will treat as a single disk, in order to increase redundancy which avoids data loss (except RAID 0), or to increase the speed at which data is written to and read from a disk. Intel RST RAID does not provide new RAID levels. It allows different areas (e.g. partitions or logical volumes) on the same disk to be assigned to different RAID devices, unlike some other RAID controllers. Intel recommends to put any critical applications and data on a RAID 1, 5, or 10 volume, with redundancy to protect against data loss. The RAID 0 volume in Matrix RAID provides fast access to large files where data loss is not a critical issue but speed is; examples include video editing, swap files, and files that are backed up. Intel Matrix RAID, Intel Rapid RAID, and Intel Smart Response Technology are together described as Intel Rapid Storage Technology.

== Operating system support ==
"Rapid Storage Technology" (RST), including creation of RAID volumes, works under Windows 7 and newer versions of Microsoft Windows. The older "Intel Matrix RAID" is supported under Microsoft Windows XP.

Linux supports Matrix RAID and Rapid Storage Technology (RST) through device mapper, with dmraid tool, for RAID 0, 1 and 10, and Linux MD RAID, with the mdadm utility, for RAID 0, 1, 10, and 5. Set up of the RAID volumes must be done by using the ROM option in the Matrix Storage Manager, then further configuration can be done in DM-RAID or MD-RAID.

FreeBSD 10+ support Intel RAID BIOS through the graid command. FreeBSD versions 6 thru 9 and MidnightBSD supported Intel Matrix RAID using the "ataraid" driver, managed through the atacontrol command. However, with older versions of FreeBSD there were critical reliability issues which include array device renaming when a disk in an array is replaced, an array being considered healthy if the machine reboot/crashes during an array rebuild, and kernel panics when a disk is lost or is removed from the bus. Some of these problems, when experienced in combination, could result in the loss of an entire array (even in the case of RAID 1).

VMware ESXi 4 does not support any RAID function nor Intel Matrix RAID based on Intel ICHxR controllers.

PGPDisk does not support Intel Matrix RAID based on Intel ICHxR, and does not support standalone drives if the "RAID" mode is enabled on the motherboard.

== Matrix Storage Manager option ROM ==
The Intel Matrix Storage Manager (IMSM) option ROM is a part of Matrix RAID that has to be used in the BIOS to create new RAID arrays. As of 2014, Intel uses "Rapid Storage Technology" – "Option Rom" – on its new chipsets, dropping the "Matrix" name. An Intel document notes that Intel Matrix Storage Manager storage changed to Intel Rapid Storage Technology beginning with version 9.5.

There have been several driver versions:

Version	Release date	Notes
v3.x.x	2003	First version for SATA drives. Versions 1 & 2 are for IDE drives without AHCI & RAID modes.
v3.5.0		
v4.x.x		Latest version in which MATRIX RAID mode is included on the named application Intel Application Accelerator RAID Edition.
v5.x.x		Since this version the MATRIX RAID mode is included on the named application Intel Matrix Storage Manager, up to version 8.9.
v5.5.0	2005	Last version to support ICH5R.
v6.x.x		
v6.0.0	2006	Included on P965 chipsets with ICH8R southbridge.
v7.x.s	2007	
v8.0.0	2008	Standard on Intel X58-based motherboards.
v8.x.x	2008	
v8.9.0	2009	latest version with WIN XP support, data loss risk: no S.M.A.R.T.support for newer HDD/SSD
v9.5.0		The product name was changed from "Intel Matrix Storage Manager" to "Intel Rapid Storage Technology"
v9.6.0	2010	
v10.1.0	2011	Last version to support ICH8R
v10.5.0	2011	Standard on Intel Z68-based motherboards. This version is the first to support RAID arrays made of HDDs with over 2.2 TB.
v10.6.0	2011-06	
v10.8.0	2011-11	Last version to officially support ICH9R (Supermicro X7SPA-L)
v11.0.0	2012-02	
v11.2.0	2012-06-07	Offers TRIM support on RAID 0 compatible with Windows 7 on Intel 7 series chipsets (earlier chipsets are officially orphaned by Intel)
v11.6.0	2012-09-12	First version for the X79 chipset
v11.7.0	2012-11	
v11.7.4.1001	2013-03	Last version to support ICH7R and ICH7M, ICH9M, ICH10R and ICH10D
v12.x.x.x	2013	
v12.7.0.1910	2013-06	Last version for the X79 chipset
v12.7.0.1936	2013-07	This version is installed on some Intel C226 Chipset-based motherboards (e.g. Asus P9D WS).
v12.8.0.1016	2013-08	Windows boot problem when using Windows 8.1 and 10 use 13.1 and up, no solution for PCH 6 as of October 2015
v12.9.0.1001	2013-12	
v12.9.4.1000	2014-07	Last version to support PCH 5, PCH 6 and mobile PCH 7 series
v13.1.0.2030	2013-08	This version is designed for the new 8 series chipset.
v13.1.0.1058	2014-05	Works with ICH10R in RAID mode on Windows Server 2019. Recommended for PCH 7 desktop
v13.x.x.x	2014	
v13.2.8.1002	2014-07	Recommended for PCH 8, 9 and 100 series
v13.6.0.1002	2014-12	Last generic version to support desktop PCH 7 series
v14.x.x.x	2015	
v14.8.18.1066	2017-09	Recommended for Intel X99 systems
v14.10.0.1016	2016-02	Last version to support PCH 8 & 9 series
v15.x.x.x	2016	
v15.9.8.1050	2019-08-08	Last version to support Windows 8.1 and earlier. Last version to support Smart Response cache acceleration with a SATA SSD.
v16.0.2.1086	2018-02	First generic version to support Skylake CPUs
v16.5.1.1030	2018-02	First generic version to support the 300 series chipsets
v16.8.3.1003	2019-07	
v17.5.2.1024	2019-08	Improved Optane support
v17.7.0.1006	2019-09	
v18.6.1.1016	2021-09	

Since release 11.2.0.0000, TRIM commands can be read by Windows RAID drivers made for 7 series chipsets. There is no RAID mode TRIM support on drivers for older chipsets.

When booting in a BIOS environment (legacy) and some EFI, the RST option ROM is used. When booting in a true UEFI environment the Option ROM is not used as a SataDriver with the RST version takes over. In BIOS mode the legacy/BIOS booting is under CSMCORE. In true UEFI mode the RST is controlled under SataDriver / RstVmdDriver in BIOS.

The Intel RAID ROM is the firmware in the motherboard BIOS that is used to create the RAID array.

Note: The RST drivers can be used for RAID and also on a single drive as it contains an AHCI driver. There is a bug in the version 12.5.0.1066 RST driver, which cause TRIM commands not to pass through the RAID driver to the drives. TRIM is disabled using this driver.

== Rapid Storage Technology enterprise (Intel RSTe) ==
Intel Rapid Storage Technology enterprise (Intel RSTe) provides performance and reliability for supported systems equipped with Serial ATA (SATA) devices, Serial Attached SCSI (SAS) devices, and/or solid state drives (SSDs) to enable an optimal enterprise storage solution. The main difference between RST and RSTe is that the RST is used for desktop systems and the RSTe is mostly used for server systems. RST supports regular SATA controllers from desktop systems.

If the BIOS of the motherboard has RSTe feature then the user cannot install Intel Rapid Storage Technology software (error message: This platform is not supported). The user has to install RSTe software.

There have been several Option ROM versions:

Version	Release date	Notes
4.3.0.1010	2014	This version is installed on some Intel C236 Chipset-based motherboards (e.g. Asus P10S WS)
5.1.0.1099	2017-04	
5.3.1.1016	2017-11	
5.5.0.2012	2018-12	

In 2019, Intel announced that the RTSe branding would be replaced, with RSTe consolidated into Intel's VROC (Virtual RAID on CPU) product line.

== Intel VROC (Virtual RAID on CPU) ==
Intel VROC was mostly designed with NVMe SSD's in mind and it is directly attached to the Intel Xeon Scalable processors. For the full functionality it uses a newer Intel technology called Intel VMD (Intel Volume Management Device).

Intel VROC is a technology from the Intel Xeon Scalable processors series and is used to provide hot-plug, surprise-removal, and LED management of NVMe SSD's for server usage. For client PC's Intel RST is still the advised software package to use.

Intel VMD is targeted for Microsoft Windows and Linux operating systems.

At the beginning of 2019, Intel released VROC 6.0 that includes RSTe. After this, the RSTe name was no longer used.

Intel VROC 6.0 supports:

- VMD NVMe RAID (Hardware License Key required)
- SATA RAID
- non-VMD NVMe RAID

== See also ==
- Non-standard RAID levels
