= GEOM =

FreeBSD software framework

GEOM is the main storage framework for the FreeBSD operating system. It is available in FreeBSD 5.0 and later releases, and provides a standardized way to access storage layers. GEOM is modular and allows for geom modules to connect to the framework. For example, the geom_mirror module provides RAID1 or mirroring functionality to the system. A number of modules are provided as part of FreeBSD and others have been developed independently and are distributed via (e.g.) GitHub.

GEOM was developed for the FreeBSD Project by Poul-Henning Kamp and NAI Labs, the Security Research Division of Network Associates, Inc. under DARPA/SPAWAR contract N66001-01-C-8035 ("CBOSS"), as part of the DARPA CHATS research program. The name symbolizes its impact on disk geometry.

== Stacked design ==
Because of geom's modular design, modules can be 'stacked' together to form a chain of geom layers. For example, on top of the geom_mirror module an encryption module can be added, such as geom_eli to provide a mirrored and encrypted volume. Each module has both consumers and providers. A provider is the 'source' of the geom module, often a physical hard drive but sometimes a virtualized disk such as a memory disk. The geom module in turn provides an 'output' device. Other geom modules, called consumers, can use this provider to create a chain of modules connected to each other.

Source → geom module → Output

is referred to as:

Provider → geom module → Consumer(s)

For example, the geom_mirror module may use (as a consumer) the following providers: /dev/ada0, /dev/ada1, while it creates (as a provider) a new device called /dev/mirror/gm0. At the end of the geom chain, often a filesystem is applied to actually use the geom provider for something useful. The provider created by geom modules behaves just like a physical hard drive and as such can contain filesystems such as FreeBSD's native Unix File System (UFS).

== Available modules ==
Storage modules

- geom_stripe (RAID0)
- geom_mirror (RAID1)
- geom_raid (Supports RAID functionality on "software raid" controllers)
- geom_raid3 (RAID3)
- geom_raid5 (RAID5, not present in -CURRENT yet)
- geom_concat (concatenating, also called spanning or JBOD)
- geom_vinum (legacy volume manager with RAID0/1/4/5 support)
- geom_ccd (legacy volume manager with RAID0 and rudimentary RAID1 support)

Encryption and compression modules

- geom_eli (also called GELI, provides traditional encryption using AES, Blowfish, Triple DES or Camellia algorithms. It can support data authentication using MD5, SHA1, SHA256, SHA384, SHA512 or RIPEMD160)
- geom_bde (also called GBDE, leading edge encryption with four cryptographic barriers)
- geom_shsec (shared secret encryption module)
- geom_uzip (read-only ZIP compressed images)

Filesystem modules

- geom_label (allows providers to have their own name labeled for easy partitioning)
- geom_journal (adds journaling support to the Unix File System (UFS))
- geom_cache (adds caching support for increased performance using RAM as buffercache)

Disk partitioning

- geom_flashmap (partition parts of e.g. Flash memory using either offsets or context)
- geom_part (supports Disk partitioning of GEOM providers)
- geom_part_apm (support Apple Partition Map)
- geom_part_bsd (supports BSD disklabel)
- geom_part_bsd64 (supports the 64-bit variant of BSD disklabels, as used by DragonFly BSD)
- geom_part_ebr (supports Extended boot record)
- geom_part_gpt (supports GUID Partition Table)
- geom_part_ldm (supports Logical Disk Manager)
- geom_part_mbr (supports Master boot record)
- geom_part_vtoc8 (supports Sun/Solaris VTOC8 disk labels)

Virtualization

- geom_mountver (enables mount verification)
- geom_multipath (support Multipath I/O to underlying disks)
- geom_nop (creates a transparent module used for debugging and testing)
- geom_gate (creates a virtual disk using network disk back-end)
- geom_virstor (allows overloading a geom provider by creating a provider larger than its consumer)
- geom_linux_lvm (reads Linux LVM2 volumes)
- geom_zero (creates a dummy provider that absorbs all writes and returns zeros on reads)
