= Nested RAID levels =

Stacked combination of two or more standard RAID levels

Nested RAID levels, also known as hybrid RAID, combine two or more of the standard RAID levels (where "RAID" stands for "redundant array of independent disks" or "redundant array of inexpensive disks") to gain performance, additional redundancy or both, as a result of combining properties of different standard RAID layouts.

Nested RAID levels are usually numbered using a series of numbers, where the most commonly used levels use two numbers. The first number in the numeric designation denotes the lowest RAID level in the "stack", while the rightmost one denotes the highest layered RAID level; for example, RAID 50 layers the data striping of RAID 0 on top of the distributed parity of RAID 5. Nested RAID levels include RAID 01, RAID 10, RAID 100, RAID 50 and RAID 60, which all combine data striping with other RAID techniques; as a result of the layering scheme, RAID 01 and RAID 10 represent significantly different nested RAID levels.

== RAID 01 (RAID 0+1) ==
A nested RAID 01 configuration

RAID 01, also called RAID 0+1, is a RAID level using a mirror of stripes, achieving both replication and sharing of data between the disks. The usable capacity of a RAID 01 array is the same as in a RAID 1 array made of the same drives, in which one half of the drives is used to mirror the other half. $(N/2) \cdot S_{\mathrm{min}}$, where $N$ is the total number of drives and $S_{\mathrm{min}}$ is the capacity of the smallest drive in the array.

At least four disks are required in a standard RAID 01 configuration, but larger arrays are also used.

If a single drive failure occurs then an entire stripe set has failed, at this point it is running effectively as RAID 0 with no redundancy. The probability of failure of a RAID 0 stripe set is always higher than that of a single disk, and increases with every disk added to it. If p is the probability that a single disk will fail during a given period, 1-p is the probability that the disk will survive that period, and the probability that the stripe set will survive is (1-p)^{n}, where n is the number of disks in the stripe set.

Additionally, higher risk is introduced during a rebuild than RAID 1+0 as all the data from all the drives in the remaining stripe has to be read rather than just from one drive, increasing the chance of an unrecoverable read error (URE) and significantly extending the rebuild window.

== RAID 03 (RAID 0+3) ==
A typical RAID 03 configuration

RAID 03, also called RAID 0+3 and sometimes RAID 53, is similar to RAID 01 with the exception that byte-level striping with dedicated parity is used instead of mirroring.

== RAID 10 (RAID 1+0) ==
A typical RAID 10 configuration

RAID 10, also called RAID 1+0 and sometimes RAID 1&0, is similar to RAID 01 with an exception that the two used standard RAID levels are layered in the opposite order; thus, RAID 10 is a stripe of mirrors.

RAID 10, as recognized by the storage industry association and as generally implemented by RAID controllers, is a RAID 0 array of mirrors, which may be two- or three-way mirrors, and requires a minimum of four drives. However, a nonstandard definition of "RAID 10" was created for the Linux MD driver; Linux "RAID 10" can be implemented with as few as two disks. Implementations supporting two disks, such as Linux RAID 10, offer a choice of layouts. Arrays of more than four disks are also possible.

According to manufacturer specifications and official independent benchmarks, in most cases RAID 10 provides better throughput and latency than all other RAID levels except RAID 0 (which wins in throughput). Thus, it is the preferable RAID level for I/O-intensive applications such as database, email, and web servers, as well as for any other use requiring high disk performance.

== RAID 50 (RAID 5+0) ==
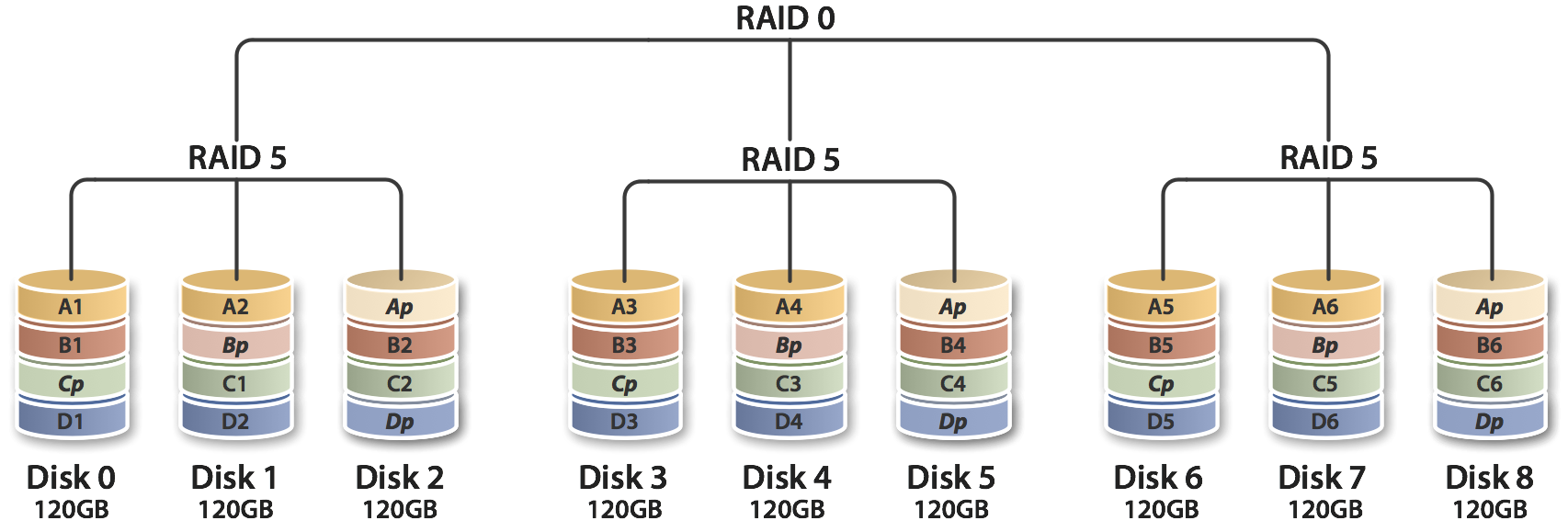
A typical RAID 50 configuration. A1, B1, etc. each represent one data block; each column represents one disk; Ap, Bp, etc. each represent parity information for each distinct RAID 5 and may represent different values across the RAID 5 (that is, Ap for A1 and A2 can differ from Ap for A3 and A4).

RAID 50, also called RAID 5+0, combines the straight block-level striping of RAID 0 with the distributed parity of RAID 5. As a RAID 0 array striped across RAID 5 elements, minimal RAID 50 configuration requires six drives. On the right is an example where three collections of 120 GB RAID 5s are striped together to make 720 GB of total storage space.

One drive from each of the RAID 5 sets could fail without loss of data; for example, a RAID 50 configuration including three RAID 5 sets can tolerate three maximum potential simultaneous drive failures (but only one per RAID 5 set). Because the reliability of the system depends on quick replacement of the bad drive so the array can rebuild, it is common to include hot spares that can immediately start rebuilding the array upon failure. However, this does not address the issue that the array is put under maximum strain reading every bit to rebuild the array at the time when it is most vulnerable.

RAID 50 improves upon the performance of RAID 5 particularly during writes, and provides better fault tolerance than a single RAID level does. This level is recommended for applications that require high fault tolerance, capacity and random access performance. As the number of drives in a RAID set increases, and the capacity of the drives increase, this impacts the fault-recovery time correspondingly as the interval for rebuilding the RAID set increases.

== RAID 60 (RAID 6+0) ==
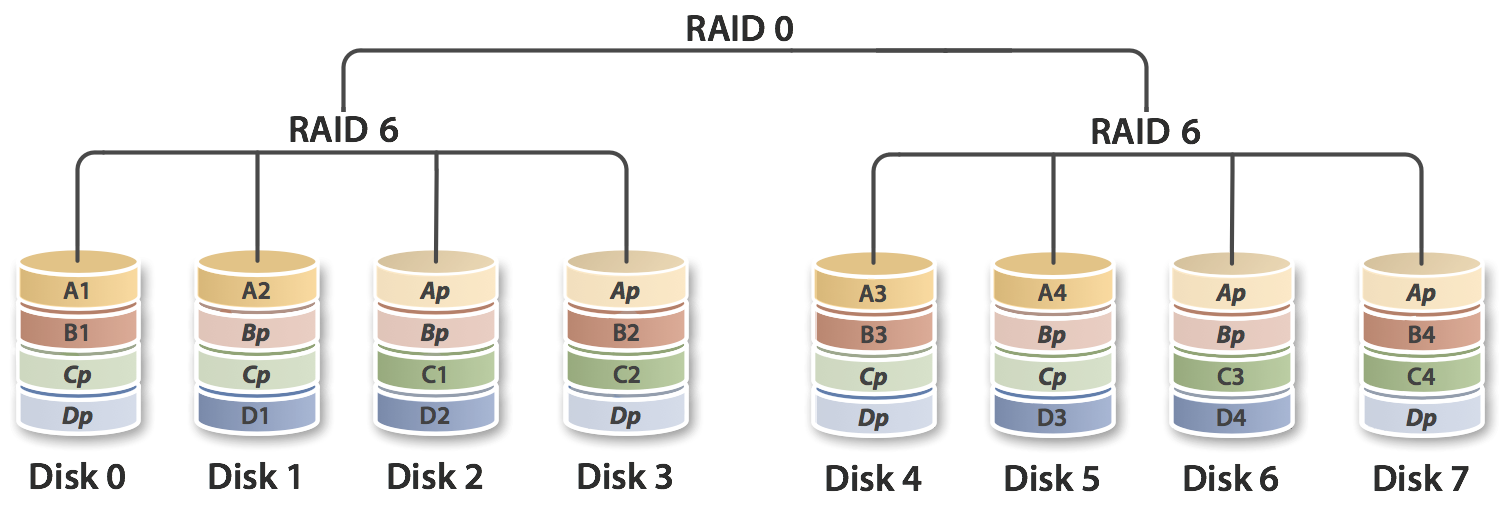
A typical RAID 60 configuration consisting of two sets of four drives each

RAID 60, also called RAID 6+0, combines the straight block-level striping of RAID 0 with the distributed double parity of RAID 6, resulting in a RAID 0 array striped across RAID 6 elements. It requires at least eight disks.

== RAID 100 (RAID 10+0) ==
A typical RAID 100 configuration

RAID 100, sometimes also called RAID 10+0, is a stripe of RAID 10s. This is logically equivalent to a wider RAID 10 array, but is generally implemented using software RAID 0 over hardware RAID 10. Being "striped two ways", RAID 100 is described as a "plaid RAID".

== Comparison ==
The following table provides an overview of some considerations for nested RAID levels. In each case:

- Space efficiency is given as an expression in terms of the number of drives, n; this expression designates a fractional value between zero and one, representing the fraction of the sum of the drives' capacities that is available for use. For example, if three drives are arranged in RAID 3, this gives an array space efficiency of 1 − 1/n = 1 − 1/3 = 2/3 ≈ 67%; thus, if each drive in this example has a capacity of 250 GB, then the array has a total capacity of 750 GB but the capacity that is usable for data storage is only 500 GB. It is sometimes necessary to use $m$ in place of $n$ due to the inherent nature of the configuration (of use in RAID 10). Fault tolerance uses $m$ for representation, in place of $n$, in certain Nested RAID levels (see below for fault tolerance calculation). $m$ is the number of disks in each mirror, rather than the total number of disks.
- Fault tolerance is the number of drive failures allowed, where min is the guaranteed number of failures the RAID can handle and max is the maximum possible without guaranteed failure.

Level	Description	Minimum number of drives (Note: Assumes a non-degenerate minimum number of drives)	Space efficiency	Fault tolerance	
Level	Description	Minimum number of drives	Space efficiency	Min	Max
RAID 01	Block-level striping, and mirroring without parity	4	1 / strips per stripe	strips per stripe − 1	n − n / strips per stripe
RAID 03	Block-level striping, and byte-level striping with dedicated parity	6	1 − 1 / strips per stripe	1	n / strips per stripe
RAID 10 (Note: Theoretical maximum read performance can be represented as n×. However this may be as low as (n / spans)× in practice, depending on configuration and implementation; theoretical maximum write performance can be represented as (n / spans)×, which is close to observed values in practice; See "Performance comparison" section above for explanation of n.)	Mirroring without parity, and block-level striping	4	1 / strips per stripe	strips per stripe − 1	(strips per stripe − 1) × strips per stripe
RAID 1+6	Mirroring without parity, and block-level striping with double distributed parity	8	(1 - 2 / strips per stripe) / 2	2 × strips per stripe	2 x strips per stripe + (n / strips per stripe) - 2
RAID 50	Block-level striping with distributed parity, and block-level striping	6	1 - (1 / strips per stripe)	1	n / strips per stripe
RAID 60	Block-level striping with double distributed parity, and block-level striping	8	1 - (2 / strips per stripe)	2	2 × (n / strips per stripe)
RAID 100	Mirroring without parity, and two levels of block-level striping	8	1 / strips per stripe	strips per stripe − 1	(strips per stripe − 1) × (strips per stripe)

== See also ==
- Non-RAID drive architectures
- Non-standard RAID levels
