= Degraded mode =

Fallback mode for a RAID storage array

When a RAID array experiences the failure of one or more disks, it can enter degraded mode, a fallback mode that generally allows the continued usage of the array, but either loses the performance boosts of the RAID technique (such as a RAID-1 mirror across two disks when one of them fails; performance will fall back to that of a normal, single drive) or experiences severe performance penalties due to the necessity to reconstruct the damaged data from error correction data.

Depending on the severity of the problem, the array may be placed into a read-only mode, either automatically or by the system administrator, until it can be corrected. Such corrections may or may not be possible to do on-line (as opposed to an "off-line" repair, during which the system is unavailable to users). Many RAID configurations feature spare disks that are already installed and can be automatically added to the array as needed; when this happens, the array may or may not go into degraded mode until the spare is rebuilt, but in any case should not be in degraded mode after the spare is rebuilt. If no spares are available, the array will remain in degraded mode until a spare disk is added, or the array is reconfigured (if that is possible for the configuration in question).

A typical case where a RAID enters degraded mode is a simple two-drive mirror after a power failure – it is unlikely the drives are in sync. Every time blocks are written to the storage elements (physical drives, in this case), certain accounting information is updated after the write. The RAID controller will notice that the storage elements are not in sync, will place the array in degraded mode, and – generally – will start a background resync (rebuild) operation. Simple mirroring solutions will resynchronize the entire array, block by block, across both drives, which can be quite time-consuming; this time can be greatly reduced by the usage of a write intent bitmap.
