= Non-RAID drive architectures =

Techniques for using multiple disk drives that do not use RAID

The most widespread standard for configuring multiple hard disk drives is RAID (redundant array of inexpensive/independent disks), which comes in a number of standard configurations and non-standard configurations. Non-RAID drive architectures also exist, and are referred to by acronyms with tongue-in-cheek similarity to RAID:

- JBOD (just a bunch of disks): described multiple hard disk drives operated as individual independent hard disk drives.
- SPAN or BIG: A method of combining the free space on multiple hard disk drives from "JBoD" to create a spanned volume. Such a concatenation is sometimes also called BIG/SPAN. A SPAN or BIG is generally a spanned volume only, as it often contains mismatched types and sizes of hard disk drives.
- MAID (massive array of idle drives): an architecture using hundreds to thousands of hard disk drives for providing nearline storage of data, primarily designed for write once, read occasionally (WORO) applications, in which increased storage density and decreased cost are traded for increased latency and decreased redundancy.

== JBOD ==
JBOD (just a bunch of disks or just a bunch of drives) is an architecture using multiple hard drives exposed as individual devices. Hard drives may be treated independently or may be combined into one or more logical volumes using a volume manager like LVM or mdadm, or a device-spanning filesystem like btrfs; such volumes are usually called "spanned" or "linear | SPAN | BIG". A spanned volume provides no redundancy, so failure of a single hard drive amounts to failure of the whole logical volume. Unlike a RAID 0 (striped) volume, the capacity of a linear volume is not limited by the smallest member drive multiplied by the total number of member drives, but the capacity simply adds up, however, the speed does not multiply like it does on a RAID 0. Redundancy for resilience and/or bandwidth improvement may be provided, in software, at a higher level.

== Concatenation (SPAN, BIG) ==
Diagram of a SPAN/BIG (JBOD) setup.

Concatenation or spanning of drives is not one of the numbered RAID levels, but it is a popular method for combining multiple physical disk drives into a single logical disk. It provides no data redundancy. Drives are merely concatenated together, end to beginning, so they appear to be a single large disk, known as SPAN or BIG.

In the adjacent diagram, data are concatenated from the end of disk 0 (block A63) to the beginning of disk 1 (block A64); end of disk 1 (block A91) to the beginning of disk 2 (block A92). If RAID 0 were used, then disk 0 and disk 2 would be truncated to 28 blocks, the size of the smallest disk in the array (disk 1) for a total size of 84 blocks.

What makes a SPAN or BIG different from RAID configurations is the possibility for the selection of drives. While RAID usually requires all drives to be of similar capacity (Note: Otherwise, in most cases only the drive portions equaling to the size of the smallest RAID set member would be used.) and it is preferred that the same or similar drive models are used for performance reasons, a spanned volume does not have such requirements.

=== Implementations ===
The initial release of Microsoft's Windows Home Server employs drive extender technology, whereby an array of independent drives is combined by the OS to form a single pool of available storage. This storage is presented to the user as a single set of network shares. Drive extender technology expands on the normal features of concatenation by providing data redundancy through software – a shared folder can be marked for duplication, which signals to the OS that a copy of the data should be kept on multiple physical drives, whilst the user will only ever see a single instance of their data. This feature was removed from Windows Home Server in its subsequent major release.

The btrfs filesystem can span multiple devices of different sizes, including RAID 0/1/10 configurations, storing 1 to 4 redundant copies of both data and metadata. (A flawed RAID 5/6 also exists, but can result in data loss.) For RAID 1, the devices must have complementary sizes. For example, a filesystem spanning two 500 GB devices and one 1 TB device could provide RAID1 for all data, while a filesystem spanning a 1 TB device and a single 500 GB device could only provide RAID1 for 500 GB of data.

The mdadm and LVM services likewise allow combining spanning and RAID.

The ZFS filesystem can likewise pool multiple devices of different sizes and implement RAID, though it is less flexible, requiring the creation of virtual devices of fixed size on each device before pooling.

In enterprise environments, enclosures are used to expand a server's data storage by using JBOD devices. This is often a convenient way to scale-up storage when needed by daisy-chaining additional disk shelves.

== MAID ==
MAID (massive array of idle drives) is an architecture using hundreds to thousands of hard drives for providing nearline storage of data. MAID is designed for write once, read occasionally (WORO) applications. Hard drives are not spun-up until they are needed.

Compared to RAID technology, MAID has increased storage density, and decreased cost, electrical power, and cooling requirements. However, these advantages are at the cost of much increased latency, significantly lower throughput, and decreased redundancy. Drives designed for multiple spin-up/down cycles (e.g. laptop drives) are significantly more expensive. Latency may be as high as tens of seconds. MAID can supplement or replace tape libraries in hierarchical storage management.

To allow a more gradual tradeoff between access time and power savings, some MAIDs such as Nexsan's AutoMAID incorporate drives capable of spinning down to a lower speed. Large scale disk storage systems based on MAID architectures allow dense packaging of drives and are designed to have only 25% of disks spinning at any one time.

== See also ==
- File-based replication
- Nested RAID levels
- Non-standard RAID levels
- Standard RAID levels
- Drobo
