= Disk data format =

Standard format for data in RAID

The SNIA common RAID disk data format (DDF) defines a standard data structure describing how data is formatted across disks in a RAID group. The DDF structure allows a basic level of interoperability between different suppliers of RAID technology. The common RAID DDF structure benefits storage users by enabling in-place data migration or recovery after controller failure using systems from different vendors.

DDF is an external metadata format that is compatible with the mdraid subsystem in the Linux kernel. The mdadm command-line utility is a part of the mdraid subsystem.
