= Data striping =

Data segmentation technique

In computer data storage, data striping is the technique of segmenting logically sequential data, such as a file, so that consecutive segments are stored on different physical storage devices.

An example of data striping. Files A and B, of four blocks each are spread over disks D1 to D3.

Striping is useful when a processing device requests data more quickly than a single storage device can provide it. By spreading segments across multiple devices which can be accessed concurrently, total data throughput is increased. It is also a useful method for balancing I/O load across an array of disks. Striping is used across disk drives in redundant array of independent disks (RAID) storage, network interface controllers, disk arrays, different computers in clustered file systems and grid-oriented storage, and RAM in some systems.

== Method ==
One method of striping is done by interleaving sequential segments on storage devices in a round-robin fashion from the beginning of the data sequence. This works well for streaming data, but subsequent random accesses will require knowledge of which device contains the data. If the data is stored such that the physical address of each data segment is assigned a one-to-one mapping to a particular device, the device to access each segment requested can be calculated from the address without knowing the offset of the data within the full sequence.

Other methods might be employed in which sequential segments are not stored on sequential devices. Such non-sequential interleaving can have benefits in some error correction schemes.

== Advantages and disadvantages ==
Advantages of striping include performance and throughput. Sequential time interleaving of data accesses allows the lesser data access throughput of each storage devices to be cumulatively multiplied by the number of storage devices employed. Increased throughput allows the data processing device to continue its work without interruption, and thereby finish its procedures more quickly. This is manifested in improved performance of the data processing.

Because different segments of data are kept on different storage devices, the failure of one device causes the corruption of the full data sequence. In effect, the failure rate of the array of storage devices is equal to the sum of the failure rate of each storage device. This disadvantage of striping can be overcome by the storage of redundant information, such as parity, for the purpose of error correction. In such a system, the disadvantage is overcome at the cost of requiring extra storage.

== Terminology ==
The segments of sequential data written to or read from a disk before the operation continues on the next disk are usually called chunks, strides or stripe units, while their logical groups forming single striped operations are called strips or stripes. The amount of data in one chunk (stripe unit), often denominated in bytes, is variously referred to as the chunk size, stride size, stripe size, stripe depth or stripe length. The number of data disks in the array is sometimes called the stripe width, but it may also refer to the amount of data within a stripe.

The amount of data in one stripe multiplied by the number of data disks in the array (i.e., stripe depth times stripe width, which in the geometrical analogy would yield an area) is sometimes called the stripe size or stripe width. Wide striping occurs when chunks of data are spread across multiple arrays, possibly all the drives in the system. Narrow striping occurs when the chunks of data are spread across the drives in a single array.

== Applications ==
Data striping is used in some databases, such as Sybase, and in certain RAID devices under software or hardware control, such as IBM's 9394 RAMAC Array subsystem. File systems of clusters also use striping. Oracle Automatic Storage Management allows ASM files to be either coarse or fine striped.

RAID
In some RAID configurations, such as RAID 0, failure of a single member drive of the RAID array causes all stored data to be lost. In other RAID configurations, such as a RAID 5 that contains distributed parity and provides redundancy, if one member drive fails the data can be restored using the other drives in the array.

LVM2
Data striping can also be achieved with Linux's Logical Volume Management (LVM). The LVM system allows for the adjustment of coarseness of the striping pattern. LVM tools will allow implementation of data striping in conjunction with mirroring. LVM offers the added benefit of read and write caching on NVM Express for slow spinning storage. LVM has other advantages that are not directly related to data striping (like snapshots, dynamic resizing, etc).

Btrfs and ZFS
Have RAID like features but with the security of chunk integrity to detect bad blocks, and the added flexibility of adding arbitrary numbers of extra drives. They also have other advantages that are not directly related to data striping (copy-on-write, etc).

== See also ==
- Partition alignment
- Link aggregation
