= Hard Disk Sentinel =

Hard disk monitoring software

Hard Disk Sentinel (HDSentinel)
- Original author: Janos Mathe
- Developer: Heartfelt Development Services
- Release: 2005-11-01
- Stable release: 6.30 / 2025-03-24
- Preview release: 6.30.4 / 2025-10-01
- Operating system: Windows, Linux, and DOS. (Limited features in Linux and DOS)
- Website: hdsentinel.com

Hard Disk Sentinel (HDSentinel) is a computer hard disk drive-monitoring software for Windows, Linux and DOS operating systems.

== History ==
Hard Disk Sentinel was founded and first released in 2005, developed by Heartfelt Development Services, based in Úrhida, Hungary, with János Máthé as the company's CEO. The first version of Hard Disk Sentinel for Windows released on 1 November 2005.

In 2007, version 2.00 released with supporting USB drives along with free trial (unregistered) version, Hard Disk Sentinel standard (paid version with basic disk monitoring) and Hard Disk Sentinel Professional (paid version with alerts, detailed reports, tests). Since 2009, with version 3.00, Hard Disk Sentinel supports numerous RAID controllers, by detection of hard disk status in RAID configurations and disk surface testing.

Since 2012, with version 4.00, Hard Disk Sentinel Pro Portable version is available, working without installation.

In 2017, Version 5.00 released with Disk Repair functionality and Network Attached Storage (NAS) monitoring, export status in XML and WMI. This allows creating third-party applications/add-ons to work together with Hard Disk Sentinel—integration with NagiOS, for example.

Version 6.10 included a more graphic interface on par with Windows 11 as well as supports quick disk repairing, additional warnings and statuses display. This version focused on some changes in favour of detecting more problems before they are able to cause data loss.

Version 6.20 included new alert options, and added the ability to define custom threshold limits of any S.M.A.R.T attribute (when Value or Data field is lower, lower or equal, higher, higher or equal, equal or not equal compared to configured threshold). Also included surface test functions that can be used on non-standard sector sizes of SAS 4Kn drives.

In October 2024, the author changed the financial partner to a different partner as Shareit did not transfer any amount to the author since July 2024. They changed it to 2Checkout now, which is much better according to the author.

Version 6.30 added/improved support for many types of HDDs, SSDs, USB flash drives, and USB enclosures/adapters. For example, it added full heath reading support of the SK Hynix T31 USB Stick. This version also improved the power-on time readings for rare drives with over 15 years of power-on time. For the Pro version, it released a new feature to allow detection of the Seagate Field Access Reliability Metrics log (FARM log) for both SAS and SATA drives. It can be accessed in Disk menu -> Device Specific Information. It also shows the Master Password ID value for drives supporting ATA security mode.

The software is designed to find, test, diagnose and repair hard disk drives, reveal problems, display health and avoid failures by using S.M.A.R.T. (Self-Monitoring, Analysis and Reporting Technology) function of hard disk drives. The detected information can be saved to file in formats such as HTML, text, or XML.

Hard Disk Sentinel has the capability to function for both internal hard disks and external hard disks as well as hybrid disk drives (SSHD), SSDs, NAS and RAID arrays within the same software.

== DOS version ==
In 2008, Hard Disk Sentinel DOS version was released in different formats on bootable pen drive, CD, floppy. It can be useful if no operating system installed (or if the system is not bootable otherwise) to detect and display temperature, health status of IDE, SATA hard disk drives and with limited AHCI controller support. However, the downside to the DOS version of Hard Disk Sentinel is that it is very limited as it will only work in older computers that support legacy boot, and can only be used to check the health of the HDD/SSD. Hard Disk Sentinel DOS version does not allow you to run disk tests and repairs.

== Linux version ==
In 2008, Hard Disk Sentinel Linux version released, a command-line console tool detection and showing disk status with limited support of RAID configuration and SSDs in addition to hard disk status detection. The Linux version is available on x86, x64 and Raspberry Pi, ARMv5 platforms.

Since 30 August 2017, the Linux version supports industrial SD cards too and can be used with NAS and DAS devices.

Linux version of Hard Disk Sentinel is still limited like the DOS version. The Linux version can only be used in the Linux Terminal, and it also does not allow you to run any disk tests or repairs. You can also save the disk report as an HTML file to get a readable format.

In 2019, a Graphical user interface ("GUI") version was released, but its functionality is very limited. Its primary purpose is just to check if the disk health is good and temperature of the disk. Other than that, there is really nothing else you can do. In addition, the GUI version had been last updated all the way back in 2021 as a minor update.

== See also ==
- Comparison of S.M.A.R.T. tools
- Data scrubbing
- Disk utility
- List of disk partitioning software
- Predictive failure analysis
- System monitor
- Optical disc § Surface error scanning
