= Computer data storage =

Storage of digital data readable by computers

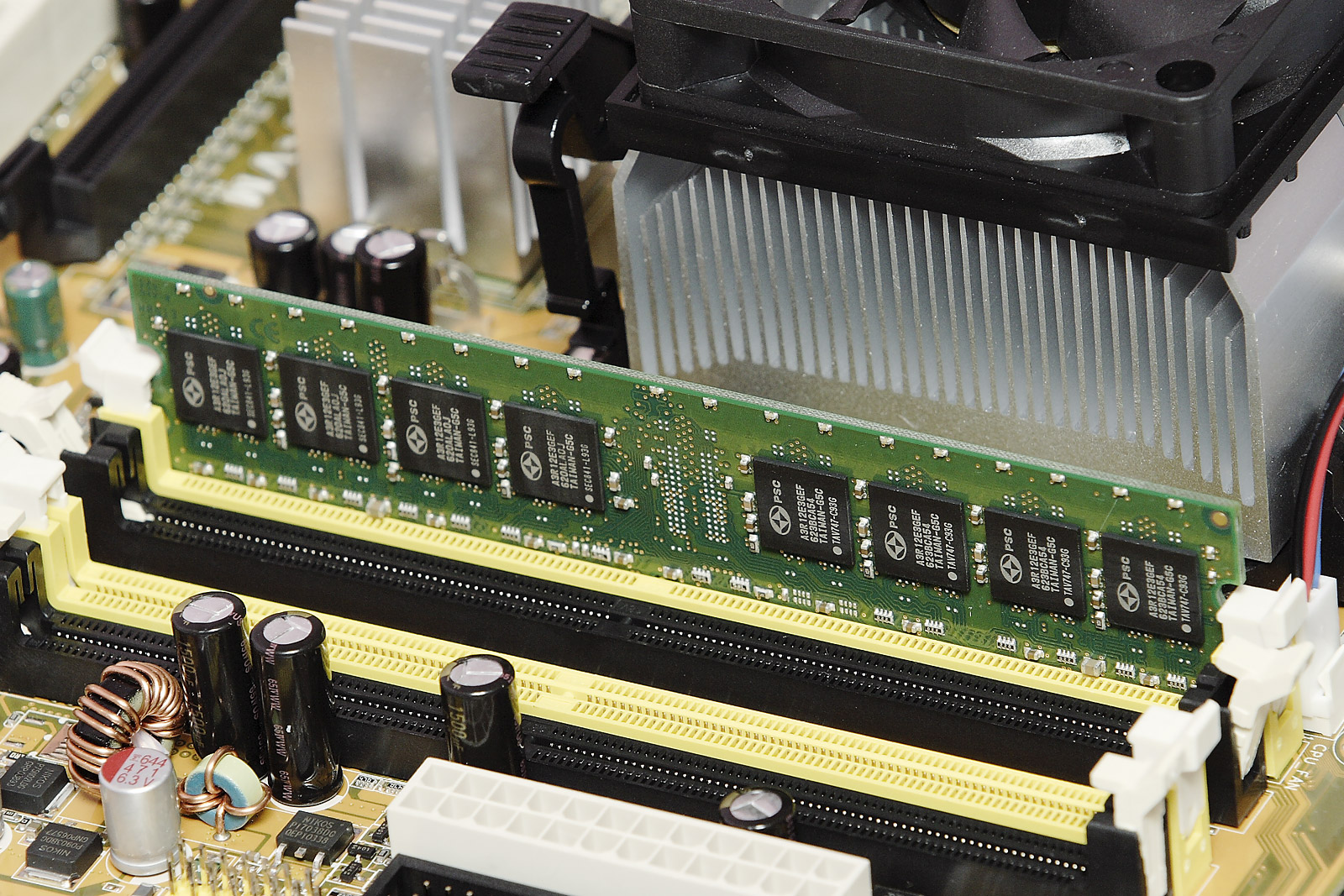
1 GiB of SDRAM mounted in a computer. An example of primary storage.

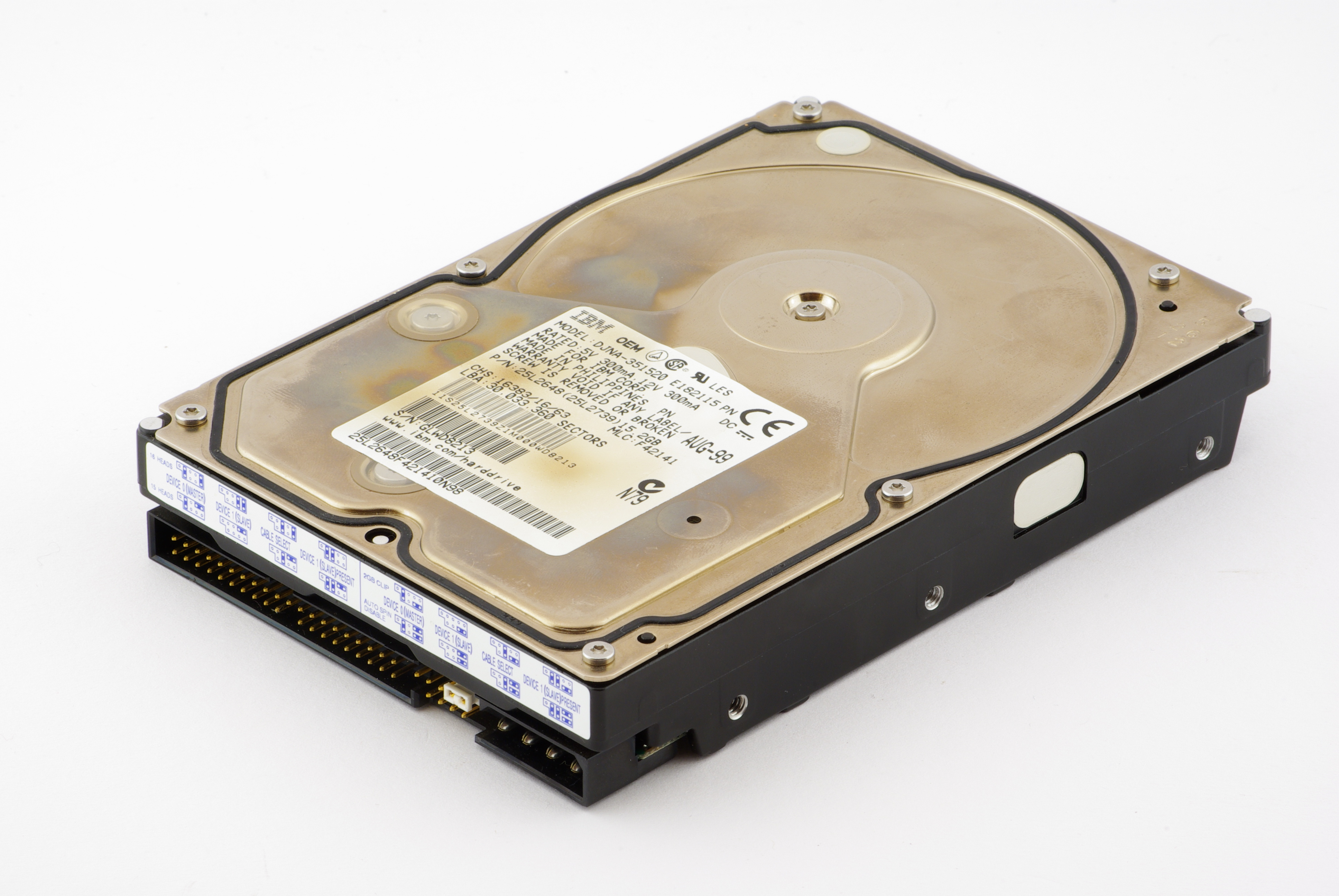
15 GB PATA hard disk drive (HDD) from 1999. When connected to a computer it serves as secondary storage.

Computer data storage or digital data storage is the retention of digital data via technology consisting of computer components and recording media. Digital data storage is a core function and fundamental component of computers.

Generally, the faster and volatile storage components are referred to as "memory", while slower persistent components are referred to as "storage". This distinction was extended in the Von Neumann architecture, where the central processing unit (CPU) consists of two main parts: The control unit and the arithmetic logic unit (ALU). The former controls the flow of data between the CPU and memory, while the latter performs arithmetic and logical operations on data. In practice, almost all computers use a memory hierarchy, which puts memory close to the CPU and storage further away.

In modern computers, hard disk drives (HDDs) or solid-state drives (SSDs) are usually used as storage.

== Data ==
A modern digital computer represents data using the binary numeral system. The memory cell is the fundamental building block of computer memory, storing stores one bit of binary information that can be set to store a 1, reset to store a 0, and accessed by reading the cell.

Text, numbers, pictures, audio, and nearly any other form of information can be converted into a string of bits, or binary digits, each of which has a value of 0 or 1. The most common unit of storage is the byte, equal to 8 bits. Digital data comprises the binary representation of a piece of information, often being encoded by assigning a bit pattern to each character, digit, or multimedia object. Many standards exist for encoding (e.g. character encodings like ASCII, image encodings like JPEG, and video encodings like MPEG-4).

=== Encryption ===
For security reasons, certain types of data may be encrypted in storage to prevent the possibility of unauthorized information reconstruction from chunks of storage snapshots. Encryption in transit protects data as it is being transmitted.

=== Compression ===
Data compression methods allow in many cases (such as a database) to represent a string of bits by a shorter bit string ("compress") and reconstruct the original string ("decompress") when needed. This utilizes substantially less storage (tens of percent) for many types of data at the cost of more computation (compress and decompress when needed). Analysis of the trade-off between storage cost saving and costs of related computations and possible delays in data availability is done before deciding whether to keep certain data compressed or not.

=== Vulnerability and reliability ===
Distinct types of data storage have different points of failure and various methods of predictive failure analysis. Vulnerabilities that can instantly lead to total loss are head crashing on mechanical hard drives and failure of electronic components on flash storage.

==== Redundancy ====
Redundancy allows the computer to detect errors in coded data (for example, a random bit flip due to random radiation) and correct them based on mathematical algorithms. The cyclic redundancy check (CRC) method is typically used in communications and storage for error detection. Redundancy solutions include storage replication, disk mirroring and redundant array of independent disks (RAID).

==== Error detection ====
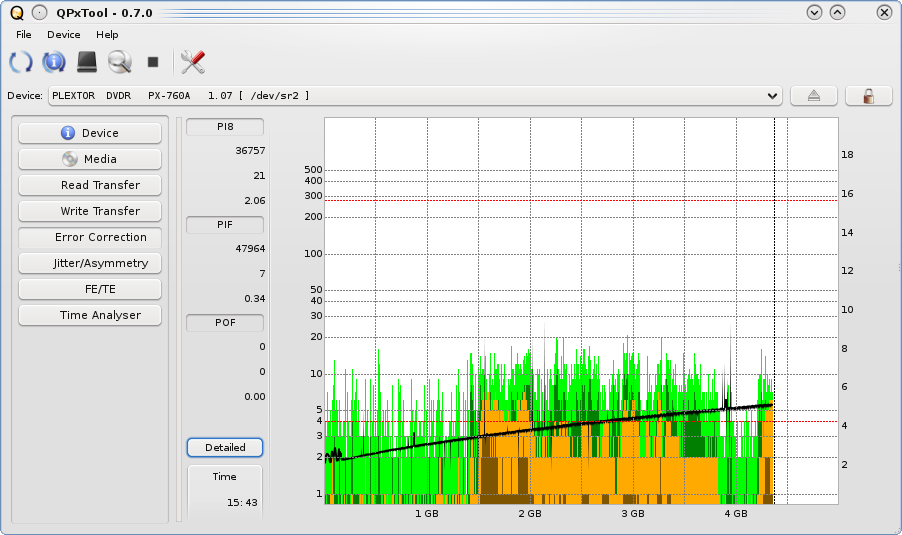
Error rate measurement on a DVD+R. The minor errors are correctable and within a healthy range.

Impending failure on hard disk drives is estimable using S.M.A.R.T. diagnostic data that includes the hours of operation and the count of spin-ups, though its reliability is disputed. The health of optical media can be determined by measuring correctable minor errors, of which high counts signify deteriorating and/or low-quality media. Too many consecutive minor errors can lead to data corruption. Not all vendors and models of optical drives support error scanning.

== Architecture ==
Without a significant amount of memory, a computer would only be able to perform fixed operations and immediately output the result, thus requiring hardware reconfiguration for a new program to be run. This is often used in devices such as desk calculators, digital signal processors, and other specialized devices. Von Neumann machines differ in having a memory in which operating instructions and data are stored, such that they do not need to have their hardware reconfigured for each new program, but can simply be reprogrammed with new in-memory instructions. They also tend to be simpler to design, in that a relatively simple processor may keep state between successive computations to build up complex procedural results. Most modern computers are von Neumann machines.

=== Storage and memory ===
In contemporary usage, the term "storage" typically refers to a subset of computer data storage that comprises storage devices and their media not directly accessible by the CPU, that is, secondary or tertiary storage. Common forms of storage include hard disk drives, optical disc drives, and non-volatile devices (i.e. devices that retain their contents when the computer is powered down). On the other hand, the term "memory" is used to refer to semiconductor read-write data storage, typically dynamic random-access memory (DRAM). Dynamic random-access memory is a form of volatile memory that also requires the stored information to be periodically reread and rewritten, or refreshed; static RAM (SRAM) is similar to DRAM, albeit it never needs to be refreshed as long as power is applied.

In contemporary usage, the memory hierarchy of primary storage and secondary storage in some uses refer to what was historically called, respectively, secondary storage and tertiary storage.

==== Primary ====
Various forms of storage, divided according to their distance from the central processing unit. The fundamental components of a general-purpose computer are arithmetic and logic unit, control circuitry, storage space, and input/output devices. Technology and capacity as in common home computers around 2005.

Main memory (also known as primary memory, internal memory or primary storage), often referred to simply as memory, is storage directly accessible to the CPU. The CPU continuously reads instructions stored there and executes them as required. Any data actively operated on is also stored there in a uniform manner. Historically, early computers used delay lines, Williams tubes, or rotating magnetic drums as primary storage. By 1954, those unreliable methods were mostly replaced by magnetic-core memory. Core memory remained dominant until the 1970s, when advances in integrated circuit technology allowed semiconductor memory to become economically competitive.

This led to modern random-access memory, which is small-sized, light, and relatively expensive. RAM used for primary storage is volatile, meaning that it loses the information when not powered for a specific time. Besides storing opened programs, it serves as disk cache and write buffer to improve both reading and writing performance. Operating systems borrow RAM capacity for caching so long as it's not needed by running software. Spare memory can be utilized as RAM drive for temporary high-speed data storage. Besides main large-capacity RAM, there are two more sub-layers of primary storage:

- Processor registers are the fastest of all forms of data storage, being located inside the processor, with each register typically holding a word of data (often 32 or 64 bits). CPU instructions instruct the arithmetic logic unit to perform various calculations or other operations on this data.
- Processor cache is an intermediate stage between faster registers and slower main memory, being faster than main memory but with much less capacity. Multi-level hierarchical cache setup is also commonly used, such that primary cache is the smallest and fastest, while secondary cache is larger and slower.

Primary storage, including ROM, EEPROM, NOR flash, and RAM, is usually byte-addressable. Such memory is directly or indirectly connected to the central processing unit via a memory bus, comprising an address bus and a data bus. The CPU firstly sends a number called the memory address through the address bus that indicates the desired location of data. Then it reads or writes the data in the memory cells using the data bus. Additionally, a memory management unit (MMU) is a small device between CPU and RAM recalculating the actual memory address. Memory management units allow for memory management; they may, for example, provide an abstraction of virtual memory or other tasks.

===== BIOS =====
Non-volatile primary storage containing a small startup program (BIOS) is used to bootstrap the computer, that is, to read a larger program from non-volatile secondary storage to RAM and start to execute it. A non-volatile technology used for this purpose is called read-only memory (ROM). Most types of "ROM" are not literally read only but are difficult and slow to write to. Some embedded systems run programs directly from ROM, because such programs are rarely changed. Standard computers largely do not store many programs in ROM, apart from firmware, and use large capacities of secondary storage.

==== Secondary ====
Secondary storage (also known as external memory or auxiliary storage) differs from primary storage in that it is not directly accessible by the CPU. Computers use input/output channels to access secondary storage and transfer the desired data to primary storage. Secondary storage is non-volatile, retaining data when its power is shut off. Modern computer systems typically have two orders of magnitude more secondary storage than primary storage because secondary storage is less expensive.

In modern computers, hard disk drives (HDDs) or solid-state drives (SSDs) are usually used as secondary storage. The access time per byte for HDDs or SSDs is typically measured in milliseconds, while the access time per byte for primary storage is measured in nanoseconds. Rotating optical storage devices, such as CD and DVD drives, have even longer access times. Other examples of secondary storage technologies include USB flash drives, floppy disks, magnetic tape, paper tape, punched cards, and RAM disks.

To reduce the seek time and rotational latency, secondary storage, including HDD, ODD and SSD, are transferred to and from disks in large contiguous blocks. Secondary storage is addressable by block; once the disk read-and-write head on HDDs reaches the proper placement and the data, subsequent data on the track are very fast to access. Another way to reduce the I/O bottleneck is to use multiple disks in parallel to increase the bandwidth between primary and secondary memory, for example, using RAID.

Secondary storage is often formatted according to a file system format, which provides the abstraction necessary to organize data into files and directories, while also providing metadata describing the owner of a certain file, the access time, the access permissions, and other information. Most computer operating systems use the concept of virtual memory, allowing the utilization of more primary storage capacity than is physically available in the system. As the primary memory fills up, the system moves the least-used chunks (pages) to a swap file or page file on secondary storage, retrieving them later when needed.

==== Tertiary ====
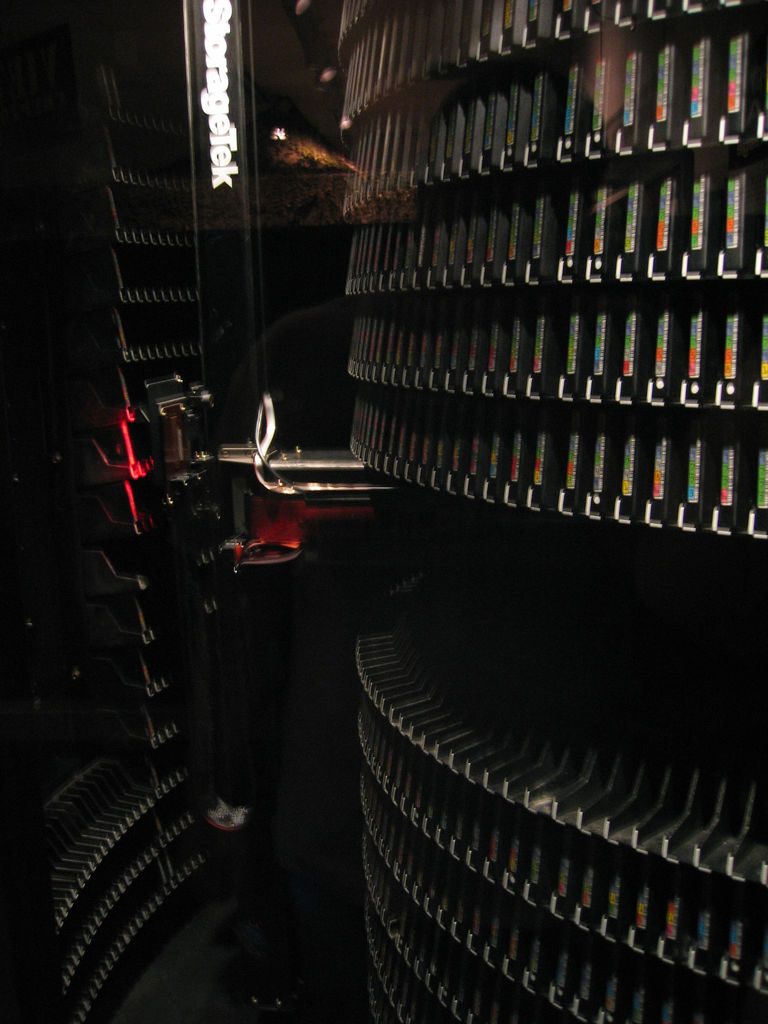
A large tape library, with tape cartridges placed on shelves in the front, and a robotic arm moving in the back. The visible height of the library is about 180 cm.

Tertiary storage or tertiary memory typically involves a robotic arm which mounts and dismount removable mass storage media from a catalog database into a storage device according to the system's demands. It is primarily used for archiving rarely accessed information, since it is much slower than secondary storage (e.g. 5–60 seconds vs. 1–10 milliseconds). This is primarily useful for extraordinarily large data stores, accessed without human operators. Typical examples include tape libraries, optical jukeboxes, and massive arrays of idle disks (MAID). Tertiary storage is also known as nearline storage because it is "near to online". Hierarchical storage management is an archiving strategy involving automatically migrating long-unused files from fast hard disk storage to libraries or jukeboxes.

==== Offline ====
Offline storage is computer data storage on a medium or a device that is not under the control of a processing unit. The medium is recorded, usually in a secondary or tertiary storage device, and then physically removed or disconnected. Unlike tertiary storage, it cannot be accessed without human interaction. It is used to transfer information since the detached medium can easily be physically transported. In modern personal computers, most secondary and tertiary storage media are also used for offline storage.

=== Network connectivity ===
Secondary or tertiary storage may connect to a computer utilizing computer networks. This concept does not pertain to the primary storage.

- Direct-attached storage (DAS) is a traditional mass storage that does not use any network.
- Network-attached storage (NAS) is mass storage attached to a computer that another computer can access at file level over a local area network, a private wide area network, or in the case of online file storage, over the Internet. NAS is commonly associated with the Network File System and Server Message Block protocol.
- Storage area network (SAN) is a specialized network that provides other computers with storage capacity. SAN is commonly associated with Fibre Channel networks.

== Cloud ==
Cloud storage is based on highly virtualized infrastructure. A subset of cloud computing, it has particular cloud-native interfaces, near-instant elasticity and scalability, multi-tenancy, and metered resources. Cloud storage services can be used from an off-premises service or deployed on-premises.

=== Deployment models ===
Cloud deployment models define the interactions between cloud providers and customers.

- Private clouds, for example, are used in cloud security to mitigate the increased attack surface area of outsourcing data storage. A private cloud is cloud infrastructure operated solely for a single organization, whether managed internally or by a third party, or hosted internally or externally.
- Hybrid cloud storage are another cloud security solution, involving storage infrastructure that uses a combination of on-premises storage resources with cloud storage. The on-premises storage is usually managed by the organization, while the public cloud storage provider is responsible for the management and security of the data stored in the cloud. Using a hybrid model allows data to be ingested in an encrypted format where the key is held within the on-premise infrastructure and can limit access to the use of on-premise cloud storage gateways, which may have options to encrypt the data prior to transfer.
- Cloud services are considered "public" when they are delivered over the public Internet.
  - A virtual private cloud (VPC) is a pool of shared resources within a public cloud that provides a certain level of isolation between the different users using the resources. VPCs achieve user isolation through the allocation of a private IP subnet and a virtual communication construct (such as a VLAN or a set of encrypted communication channels) between users as well as the use of a virtual private network (VPN) per VPC user, securing, by means of authentication and encryption, the remote access of the organization to its VPC resources.

=== Types ===
There are three types of cloud storage:

- Object storage
- File storage
- Block-level storage is a concept in cloud-hosted data persistence where cloud services emulate the behaviour of a traditional block device, such as a physical hard drive, where storage is organised as blocks. Block-level storage differs from object stores or 'bucket stores' or to cloud databases. These operate at a higher level of abstraction and are able to work with entities such as files, documents, images, videos or database records. At one time, block-level storage was provided by SAN, and NAS provided file-level storage. With the shift from on-premises hosting to cloud services, this distinction has shifted.
  - Instance stores are a form of cloud-hosted block-level storage, being provided as part of a cloud instance. Unlike other forms of block storage, instance store data will be lost the cloud instance is stopped.

== Characteristics ==
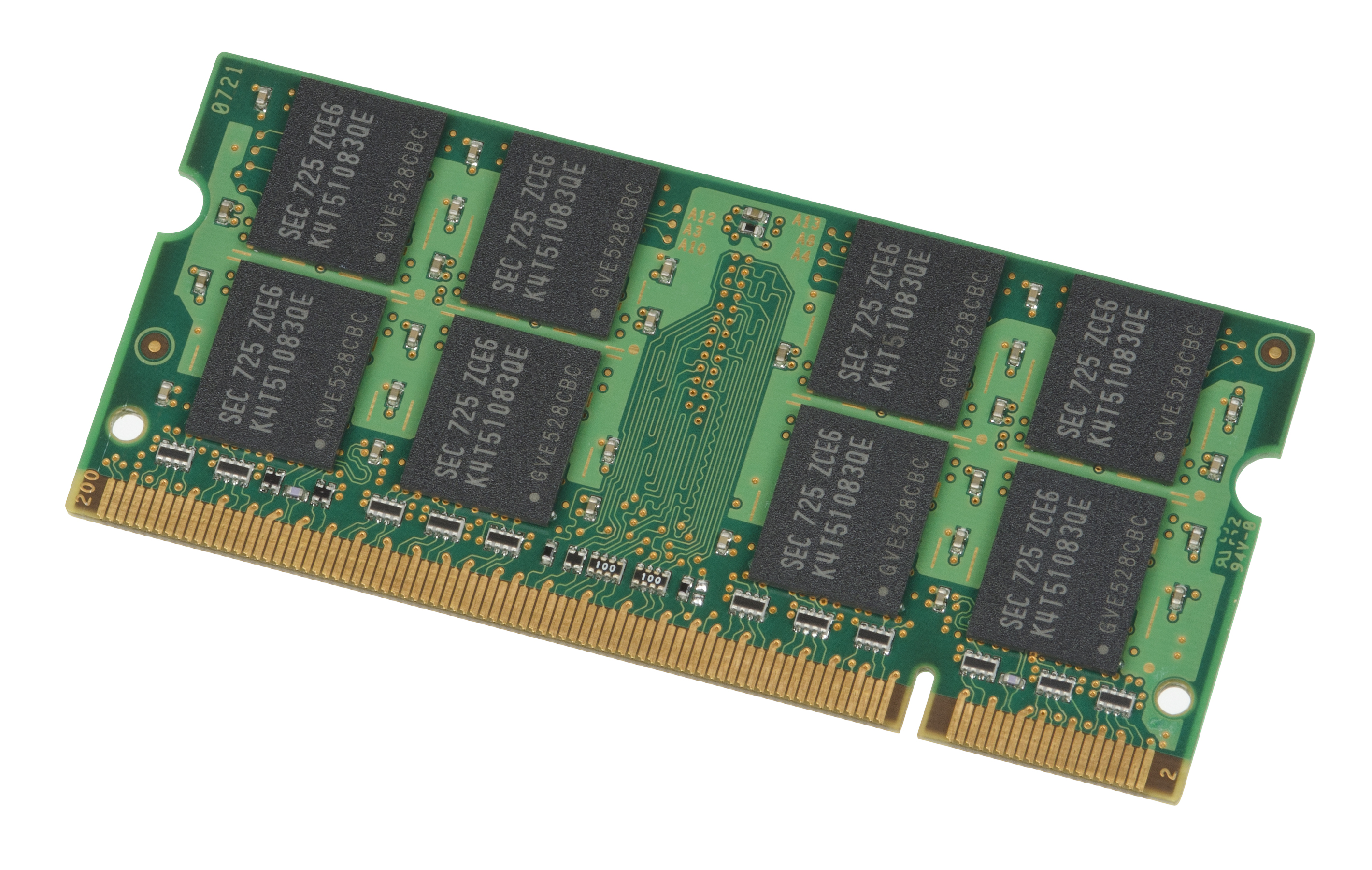
A 1 GiB module of laptop DDR2 RAM

Storage technologies at all levels of the storage hierarchy can be differentiated by evaluating certain core characteristics as well as measuring characteristics specific to a particular implementation. These core characteristics are:

- Volatility
  - An uninterruptible power supply (UPS) can be used to give a computer a brief window of time to move information from primary volatile storage into non-volatile storage before the batteries are exhausted. Some systems, for example EMC Symmetrix, have integrated batteries that maintain volatile storage for several minutes.
- Mutability
  - Storage can be classified into read/write, slow-write/fast-read (e.g. CD-RW, SSD), write-once/read-many or WORM (e.g. programmable read-only memory, CD-R), read-only storage (e.g. mask ROM ICs, CD-ROM).
- Accessibility
  - Types of access include random access and sequential access. In random access, any location in storage can be accessed at any moment in approximately the same amount of time. In sequential access, the accessing of pieces of information will be in a serial order, one after the other; therefore the time to access a particular piece of information depends upon which piece of information was last accessed.
- Addressability
  - Storage can be location accessible (i.e. selected with its numerical memory address), file addressable, or content-addressable.
- Capacity and density
- Performance
  - Storage performance metrics include latency, throughput, granularity and reliability.
- Energy
  - Low capacity solid-state drives have no moving parts and consume less power than hard disks. Also, memory may use more power than hard disks. Large caches, which are used to avoid hitting the memory wall, may also consume a large amount of power.
- Security

Overview
Characteristic	Hard disk drive	Optical disc	Flash memory	Random-access memory	Linear tape-open
Technology	Magnetic disk	Laser beam	Semiconductor		Magnetic tape
Volatility	No	No	No	Volatile	No
Random access	Yes	Yes	Yes	Yes	No
Latency (access time)	~15 ms (swift)	~150 ms (moderate)	None (instant)	None (instant)	Lack of random access (very slow)
Controller	Internal	External	Internal	Internal	External
Failure with imminent data loss	Head crash	—	Circuitry		—
Error detection	Diagnostic (S.M.A.R.T.)	Error rate measurement	Indicated by downward spikes in transfer rates	(Short-term storage)	Unknown
Price per space	Low	Low	High	Very high	Very low (but expensive drives)
Price per unit	Moderate	Low	Moderate	High	Moderate (but expensive drives)
Main application	Mid-term archival, routine backups, server, workstation storage expansion	Long-term archival, hard copy distribution	Portable electronics; operating system	Real-time	Long-term archival

== Media ==
=== Semiconductor ===
Semiconductor memory uses semiconductor-based integrated circuit (IC) chips to store information. Data are typically stored in metal–oxide–semiconductor (MOS) memory cells. A semiconductor memory chip may contain millions of memory cells, consisting of tiny MOS field-effect transistors (MOSFETs) and/or MOS capacitors. Both volatile and non-volatile forms of semiconductor memory exist, the former using standard MOSFETs and the latter using floating-gate MOSFETs.

In modern computers, primary storage almost exclusively consists of dynamic volatile semiconductor random-access memory (RAM), particularly dynamic random-access memory (DRAM). Since the turn of the century, a type of non-volatile floating-gate semiconductor memory known as flash memory has steadily gained share as off-line storage for home computers. Non-volatile semiconductor memory is also used for secondary storage in various advanced electronic devices and specialized computers that are designed for them.

As early as 2006, notebook and desktop computer manufacturers started using flash-based solid-state drives (SSDs) as default configuration options for the secondary storage either in addition to or instead of the more traditional HDD.

=== Magnetic ===
Magnetic storage uses different patterns of magnetization on a magnetically coated surface to store information. Magnetic storage is non-volatile. The information is accessed using one or more read/write heads which may contain one or more recording transducers. A read/write head only covers a part of the surface so that the head or medium or both must be moved relative to another in order to access data. In modern computers, magnetic storage will take these forms:

- Magnetic disk;
  - Floppy disk, used for off-line storage;
  - Hard disk drive, used for secondary storage.
- Magnetic tape, used for tertiary and off-line storage;
- Carousel memory (magnetic rolls).

In early computers, magnetic storage was also used as:

- Microcode storage in transformer read-only storage;
- Primary storage in a form of magnetic memory, or core memory, core rope memory, thin-film memory and/or twistor memory;
- Magnetic tape was often used for secondary storage;
- Tertiary (e.g. NCR CRAM) or off-line storage in the form of magnetic cards.

Magnetic storage does not have a definite limit of rewriting cycles like flash storage and rewritable optical media, as altering magnetic fields causes no physical wear. Rather, their lifespan is limited by mechanical parts.

=== Optical ===
Optical storage, the typical optical disc, stores information in deformities on the surface of a circular disc and reads this information by illuminating the surface with a laser diode and observing the reflection. Optical disc storage is non-volatile. The deformities may be permanent (read-only media), formed once (write-once media) or reversible (recordable or read/write media). The following forms are in common use as of 2009:

- CD, CD-ROM, DVD, BD-ROM: Read-only storage, used for mass distribution of digital information (music, video, computer programs);
- CD-R, DVD-R, DVD+R, BD-R: Write-once storage, used for tertiary and off-line storage;
- CD-RW, DVD-RW, DVD+RW, DVD-RAM, BD-RE: Slow write, fast read storage, used for tertiary and off-line storage;
- Ultra Density Optical or UDO is similar in capacity to BD-R or BD-RE and is slow-write, fast-read storage used for tertiary and off-line storage.

Magneto-optical disc storage is optical disc storage where the magnetic state on a ferromagnetic surface stores information. The information is read optically and written by combining magnetic and optical methods. Magneto-optical disc storage is non-volatile, sequential access, slow write, fast read storage used for tertiary and off-line storage.

3D optical data storage has also been proposed.

Light-induced magnetization melting in magnetic photoconductors has also been proposed for high-speed, low-energy-consumption magneto-optical storage.

=== Paper ===
Paper data storage, typically in the form of paper tape or punched cards, has long been used to store information for automatic processing, particularly before general-purpose computers existed. Information was recorded by punching holes into the paper or cardboard medium and was read mechanically (or later optically) to determine whether a particular location on the medium was solid or contained a hole. Barcodes make it possible for objects that are sold or transported to have some computer-readable information securely attached.

Relatively small amounts of digital data (compared to other digital data storage) may be backed up on paper as a matrix barcode for very long-term storage, as the longevity of paper typically exceeds even magnetic data storage.

=== Other ===
- Vacuum-tube memory:
  - A Williams tube used a cathode ray tube, and a Selectron tube used a large vacuum tube to store information.
- Electro-acoustic memory: Delay-line memory used sound waves in a substance such as mercury to store information.
- Optical tape is a medium for optical storage, generally consisting of a long and narrow strip of plastic, onto which patterns can be written and from which the patterns can be read back.
- Phase-change memory uses different mechanical phases of phase-change material to store information in an X–Y addressable matrix and reads the information by observing the varying electrical resistance of the material.
- Holographic data storage stores information optically inside crystals or photopolymers, for example, in HVDs (Holographic Versatile Discs). Holographic storage can utilize the whole volume of the storage medium, unlike optical disc storage, which is limited to a small number of surface layers.
- Magnetic photoconductors store magnetic information, which can be modified by low-light illumination.
- Molecular memory stores information in polymers that can store electric charge.
- DNA stores digital information in DNA nucleotides.

== See also ==
- Aperture (computer memory)
- Mass storage
- Memory leak
- Memory protection
- Page address register
- Stable storage

=== Secondary, tertiary and off-line storage topics ===
- Data deduplication
- Data proliferation
- Data storage tag used for capturing research data
- Disk utility
- File system
- Flash memory
- Geoplexing
- Information repository
- Noise-predictive maximum-likelihood detection
- Removable media
- Spindle
- Virtual tape library
- Wait state
- Write buffer
- Write protection
- Cold data
