= Smartmontools =

Set of computer storage utility programs

smartmontools
- Developers: Bruce Allen, Christian Franke, Guido Guenther
- Release: October 2002
- Stable release: 7.5 / April 30, 2025; 15 months ago
- Written in: C, C++
- Operating system: Unix-like (Linux, Mac OS X, BSD, others) and Microsoft Windows
- Size: 1.3 MB
- Type: Hard Disk utility
- License: GNU GPL
- Website: www.smartmontools.org

smartmontools (S.M.A.R.T. Monitoring Tools) is a set of utility programs (smartctl and smartd) to control and monitor computer storage systems using the Self-Monitoring, Analysis and Reporting Technology (S.M.A.R.T.) system built into most modern (P)ATA, Serial ATA, SCSI/SAS and NVMe hard drives.

smartmontools displays early warning signs of hard drive problems detected by S.M.A.R.T., often giving notice of impending failure while it is still possible to back data up.

From late 2010 ATA Error Recovery Control configuration has been supported by smartmontools, allowing it to configure many desktop- and laptop-class hard drives for use in a RAID array and vice versa.

Most Linux distributions provide the smartmontools package.

== User interface ==
=== Native ===
smartctl and smartd have a command-line interface. By default the output of smartctl is in human readable form; for programmatic use, JSON output is also available.

=== Third-party GUI ===
- GSmartControl is an open-source multi-platform graphical user interface (GUI) for smartctl developed by Alexander Shaduri.
- SMART Utility is a program for Mac OS X with a GUI based on smartmontools.
- HDD Guardian was an open-source Windows-only GUI for smartctl, discontinued on 28 April 2017. The author said that the program could still be downloaded from various sites, but that the entire HDD Guardian project (source code, builds and documentation) had been retired.

== See also ==
- System monitor
- Comparison of S.M.A.R.T. tools
