= DiskSpd =

Type of storage benchmarking tool

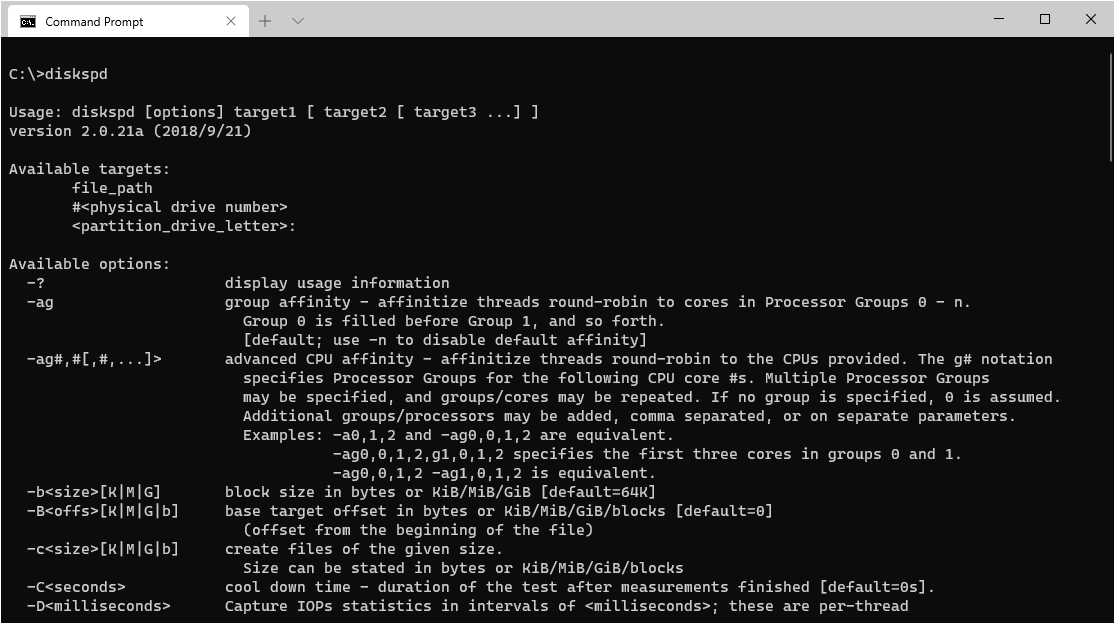
- Developer: Microsoft
- Stable release: 2.3 / September 4, 2026; 24 days ago
- Written in: C++
- Operating system: Windows 10 (version 1803) or later
- Platform: x86-64, ARM64
- Available in: English
- Type: Benchmark program
- License: MIT License
- Website: aka.ms/diskspd
- Repository: github.com/Microsoft/diskspd

DiskSpd is a free and open-source command-line tool for storage benchmarking on Microsoft Windows that generates a variety of requests against computer files, partitions or storage devices and presents collected statistics as text in the command-line interface or as an XML file.

== Overview ==
The command supports physical and virtual storage including hard disk drive (HDD), solid-state drives (SSD), and solid-state hybrid drives (SSHD). It provides control over the testing methods, duration, threads, queues, IO and processor affinity, and reporting.

In 2024, the command was updated to handle modern workloads and hardware like NVMe.

DiskSpd worked on desktop versions of Windows 7, Windows 8, Windows 8.1, Windows 10, as well as Windows Server 2012, Windows 2012 R2, and Windows Server 2016. As of 2026, the current binary release (version 2.3) includes builds for x86-64 and ARM64 and requires Windows 10 version 1803 or later; some newer features, such as the IoRing I/O path and BypassIO mode, require Windows 11. Earlier releases supported older versions of Windows, with version 2.2 supporting Windows 8 and Windows Server 2012 or later.

It is licensed under MIT License and the source code is available on GitHub.

== Example ==
Benchmark two drives (C: and E:) using a 100 MB test file, and run the test for a duration of 60 seconds (the default is 10).

C:\>diskspd -c100M -d60 c: e:

== History ==
DiskSpd was developed by Microsoft's Windows and Cloud Server Infrastructure Engineering teams as a storage load generator and performance test tool. In December 2015, Microsoft retired its SQLIO Disk Subsystem Benchmark Tool, redirected the download page to DiskSpd, and recommended DiskSpd for storage testing with SQL Server. In April 2016 Microsoft announced that DiskSpd's source code was available on GitHub, alongside the release of VMFleet, a set of storage test scripts. The CrystalDiskMark utility was rewritten to use DiskSpd for its tests in version 4.0.

Version 2.0.21a (September 2018) added support for memory-mapped I/O and for Event Tracing for Windows. Version 2.2 (June 2024) reworked the asynchronous I/O loop to improve latency measurement on fast storage at high queue depths, and added processor topology reporting, including the efficiency class of hybrid-architecture cores. Version 2.3 (September 2026) added an IoRing-based I/O path, BypassIO modes, and topology-aware thread-affinity controls.

== See also ==
- Iometer
- ProcDump
