= Windows Hardware Error Architecture =

Hardware error handling mechanism

The Windows Hardware Error Architecture (WHEA) is a hardware error handling framework introduced for Microsoft Windows with Windows Vista SP1 and Windows Server 2008 as a successor to Machine Check Architecture (MCA) on previous versions of Windows. WHEA consists of several software components that interact with the hardware and firmware of a given platform to handle and notify regarding hardware error conditions. Collectively, these components provide: a generic means of discovering errors, a common error report format for those errors, a way of preserving error records, and an error event model based on Event Tracing for Windows (ETW).

WHEA allows third-party software to interact with the operating system and react to certain hardware events. For example, when a new CPU is added to a running system—a Windows Server feature known as Dynamic Hardware Partitioning—the hardware error component stack is notified that a new processor was installed.

WHEA builds on existing hardware error reporting mechanisms, including PCI Express Advanced Error Reporting and firmware-provided interfaces such as the ACPI Platform Error Interface (APEI), introduced in ACPI 4.0. On Linux systems, APEI is implemented directly within the kernel, whereas Windows integrates APEI error sources through WHEA.

== See also ==
- Machine-check exception (MCE)
- Reliability, availability and serviceability (RAS)
- RAMS (reliability, availability, maintainability and safety)
- High availability (HA)
- Blue screen of death
