= CrystalDiskMark =

Disk benchmark tool for Microsoft Windows

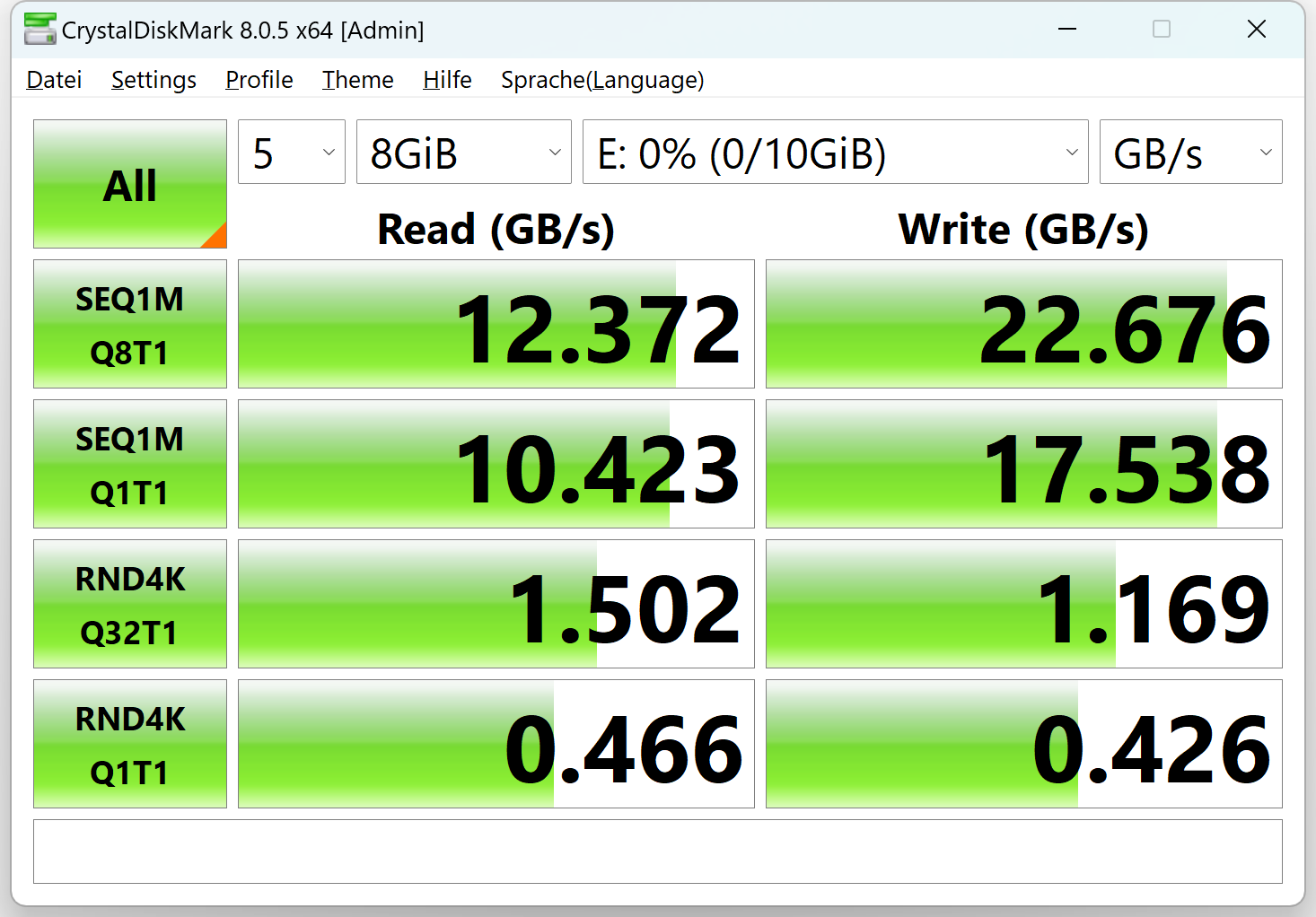
- CrystalDiskMark 8.0.5 x64 testing a RAM disk
- Developer: Noriyuki Miyazaki
- Release: January 31, 2007; 19 years ago (BSD 3-Clause)
- Stable release: 9.0.3 / 24 May 2026; 3 months ago
- Written in: C++
- Operating system: Microsoft Windows
- Size: 4 MB
- Available in: 44 languages
- List of languages India English, Japanese, Russian, Chinese, etc.
- License: MIT license
- Website: crystalmark.info/en/

CrystalDiskMark is an open source disk drive benchmark tool for Microsoft Windows from Crystal Dew World. Based on Microsoft's MIT-licensed Diskspd tool, this graphical benchmark is commonly used for testing the performance of solid-state storage. It works by reading and writing through the filesystem in a volume-dependent way. It generates read/write speeds in sequential and random positions with varying numbers of queues and threads. Solid-state drives tend to excel at random IO, as unlike hard drives, they do not need to seek for the specific position to read from or write to.

There is a macOS clone version of it called AmorphousDiskMark developed by Katsura Shareware, named after the non-crystalline amorphous state of solids.

== CrystalDiskInfo ==
CrystalDiskInfo
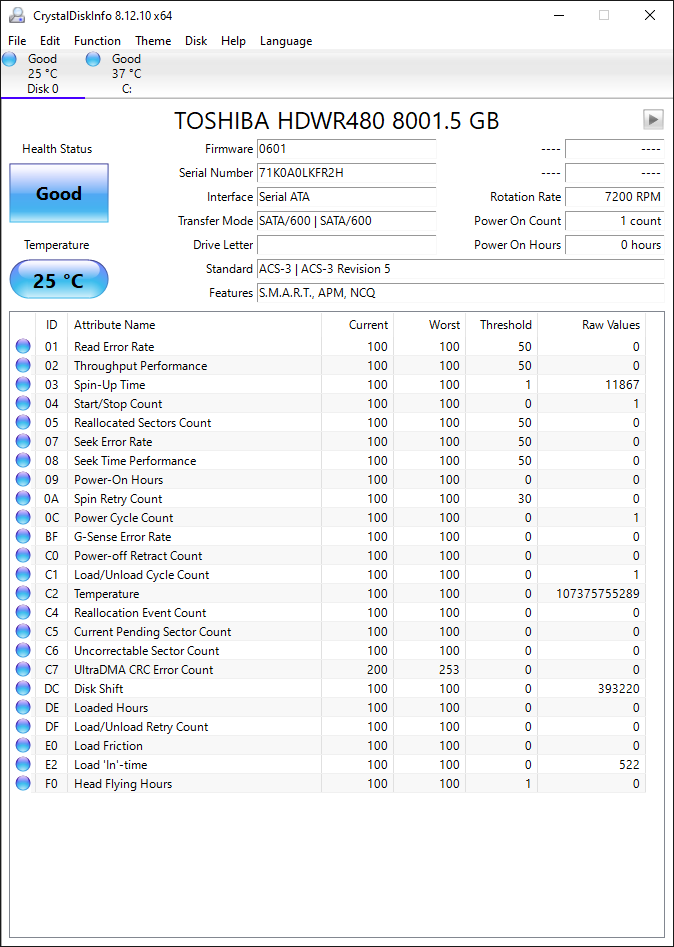
- CrystalDiskInfo showing the hard drive's health condition and the SMART values
- Developer: Noriyuki Miyazaki
- Release: May 22, 2008; 18 years ago (BSD 3-Clause)
- Stable release: 9.9.2 / 25 July 2026; 33 days ago
- Written in: C++
- Operating system: Microsoft Windows
- Size: 5 MB
- Available in: 44 languages
- List of languages English, Japanese, Russian, Chinese, etc.
- License: MIT license
- Website: crystalmark.info/en/software/crystaldiskinfo/
- Repository: github.com/hiyohiyo/CrystalDiskInfo

CrystalDiskInfo is an MIT-licensed S.M.A.R.T. utility for reading and monitoring disk drive status. Like CrystalDiskMark, this tool is designed with an emphasis around solid state devices, supporting NVMe connections in addition to the usual PATA and SATA. Other features include Intel RAID support, e-mail and sound warnings, and AAM/APM adjustment.

== AmorphousDiskMark ==
It is a port of CrystalDiskMark for Mac OS X, published by Katsura Shareware, developed by X user polydron.

== AmorphousMemoryMark ==
It is a memory benchmarking programme for Mac OS X that uses CrystalDiskMark's user interface.

== Marketing ==
=== Suisho Shizuku ===
Suisho Shizuku (Japanese: 水晶雫), illustrated by Kirino Kasumu (Japanese: 桐野霞) of Hermit Penguin, produced by Bellche Tachibana (Japanese: 橘べるちぇ), and voiced by Hiromi Igarashi of Mausu Promotion, is Crystal Dew World's first mascot, introduced in CrystalDiskMark 3.0.2 in 2012-10-26 as separate release. The character's own website was announced in 2014-01-10. The character's Twitter account was opened in December 2013 Japan time, but was only announced in 2014-08-28. As of CrystalDiskInfo 7, she is voiced in Japanese in the special version.

Shikuku editions of other Crystal Dew World software include CrystalDiskInfo since 5.0.0 (2012-06-16).

Suisho Shizuku also has a crossover with Foxkonkochan (ふぉっくす紺子ちゃん), a Foxconn mascot originally for authorized Foxconn Japanese dealer unistar, Inc. (later Mediabank Corp (メディアバンク株式会社)) announced by the company in 2014-02-25) designed by Nakano Tsukasa (永野つかさ) of e.l.fields, where both characters appear in a postcard that were included with purchases at selected stores in 2015-12-12.

=== Kurei Kei/Pronama-chan ===
Kurei Kei (Japanese: 暮井 慧(くれいけい))/Pronama-chan (Japanese: プロ生ちゃん), a Pronama LLC mascot designed by Ixy（いくしー） (Nareru! Systems Engineer illustrator), and voiced by Sumire Uesaka of KING RECORD CO., LTD., was the second mascot used in Crystal Dew World's software, introduced in CrystalDiskInfo 7.1.0 (2017-08-04).

As part of CrystalDiskInfo Kurei Kei Edition premiere launch, CrystalDiskInfo Kurei Kei Edition x OLIOSPEC B2-sized posters were given away with purchases at OLIOSPEC in 2017-08-04, with a CrystalDiskInfo Kurei Kei Edition theme images contest taking place between 2017-08-04 and 2017-10-01. The contest's Ultimate prize was won by Kohaku Muro (Japanese: 琥珀むろ).

=== Tsukumo Tokka ===
Virtual salesperson android Tsukumo Tokka (Japanese: バーチャル販売員・アンドロイドの九十九（ツクモ）トッカ), a Virtual Cast Shopping (Japanese: バーチャルキャストショッピング) (Project White Co., Ltd.'s online channel) mascot designed by ?, was the third mascot used in Crystal Dew World's software, introduced in CrystalDiskMark 8.0.2 (2020-06-01).

=== Suisho Aoi ===
Suisho Aoi mascot was introduced in CrystalDiskInfo 9.2.0, to celebrate Crystal Dew World's 25th anniversary.

== See also ==
- Comparison of S.M.A.R.T. tools
