= Comparison of S.M.A.R.T. tools =

This is an incomplete list of software that reads S.M.A.R.T. (Self-Monitoring, Analysis, and Reporting Technology) data from hard drives.

Name	Operating system	License	User interface	Fixed drives	USB, eSATA and removable drives	RAID support (Note: Disks that are members of a RAID array may in some cases have their SMART attributes (data) largely inaccessible to the operating system, or to monitoring tools and software. This depends case-by-case on the RAID controller, operating system, and tools. As of 2012 inroads have been made into this, as RAID becomes wider used, but is still far from assured and not supported by all controllers, systems, or tools.)	Shows S.M.A.R.T. attributes	Hard drive self-testing	Notification	Notes
AIDA64	Windows	Trialware	GUI	IDE(PATA), SATA, NVMe	eSATA, USB	Some RAID controllers	Yes	No	Monitoring only available in the Business Edition	
Argus Monitor	Windows	Trialware	GUI	IDE(PATA), SATA	eSATA, USB	Some RAID controllers	Yes	?	By window, sound, email, program execution at choosable parameter changes, threshold	Also shows temperature of CPU, GPU, CPU core speed, Intel Turbo Boost status, CPU power consumption, system load and system fan speeds. Can control speed of GPU and system fans.
CrystalDiskInfo	Windows	MIT	GUI	IDE(PATA), SATA, NVMe	eSATA, USB, IEEE 1394	Several RAID controllers	Yes	No	Mail, sound and popup	Sister utility to CrystalDiskMark. Has AAM/APM control.
Defraggler	Windows	Freeware	GUI	IDE(PATA), SATA	eSATA, USB	No	Yes	No	No	Primarily a defragmenter; supports basic S.M.A.R.T. stat display, includes the one-word summary of drive-health.
Disk Utility	macOS	Commercial proprietary	GUI	Yes	eSATA and removable drives	?	No	No	No	Summary information includes one line for S.M.A.R.T.
GNOME Disks	Linux	LGPL v2+	GUI	IDE(PATA), SATA, NVMe	USB	?	Yes	Yes	GNOME pop-up notification	LiveCDs are available for download, allowing the user to use GNOME Disks without any changes to the computer.
Hard Disk Sentinel	Windows, Linux, DOS	Trialware	GUI and CLI (for Linux and DOS)	IDE, SATA, SAS, NVMe, SCSI	USB, eSATA, FireWire	Several RAID controllers	Yes	Yes	Pop-up, Sound, Email, Network message	
HDDExpert	Windows	Freeware	GUI	IDE(PATA), SATA	?	?	Yes	Yes	Yes	Available from KC Softwares
smartmontools	Windows, Unix-like (Linux, macOS, BSD, etc.)	GNU GPL v2	CLI and GUI (via GSmartControl and HDD Guardian)	All for Linux, some for other Unix-like	See list of supported devices; SAT driver required on macOS only	Several RAID controllers	Yes	Yes	window, sound, email, program execution at choosable parameter changes, threshold	LiveCDs are available for download, allowing the user to use smartmontools without any changes to the computer. Unlike CrystalDiskInfo, it does not require elevation for basic functionality on Windows.
Speccy	Windows	Freeware	GUI	IDE(PATA), SATA	No	?	Yes	No	No	
SpeedFan	Windows	Freeware	GUI	(S)ATA, SCSI, SAT; Areca, 3ware	Yes	Some RAID controllers	Yes	Yes	Window, sound, e-mail, running a command; at parameter changes, threshold, temperature	Estimate health and performance by percentage, and offers online drive analysis (and compares from other users).
SpinRite	DOS, FreeDOS	Commercial proprietary	GUI	Yes	Yes	No	Yes	Yes	No	
Name	Operating system	License, price	User interface	Fixed drives	USB, eSATA and removable drives	RAID support	Shows S.M.A.R.T. attributes	Hard drive self-testing	Notification	Notes
