= Iometer =

Type of benchmarking tool

- Original author(s): Sean Hefty, David Levine, Fab Tillier
- Developer(s): Intel Corporation, Open Source Development Labs
- Stable release: 1.1.0 / 17 December 2014; 10 years ago
- Repository: sourceforge.net/projects/iometer/
- Available in: English
- Type: Benchmark program
- License: Intel Open Source License
- Website: www.iometer.org

Iometer is an I/O subsystem measurement and characterization tool for single and clustered systems. It is used as a benchmark and troubleshooting tool and is easily configured to replicate the behaviour of many popular applications. One commonly quoted measurement provided by the tool is IOPS.

== History ==
Created by Intel Corporation (Sean Hefty, David Levine and Fab Tillier are listed by the Iometer About dialog as the developers), the tool was officially announced at the Intel Developer Forum (IDF) on 17 February 1998. In 2001 Intel discontinued development and subsequently handed the sources to the Open Source Development Lab for release under the Intel Open Source License. On 15 November 2001 the Iometer project was registered at SourceForge.net and an initial version was made available. Experiencing no further development, the project was relaunched by Daniel Scheibli in February 2003. Since then it has been driven by an international group of individuals who have been improving and porting the product to additional platforms.

== Functionality ==
Iometer is based on a client–server model, where one instance of the Iometer graphical user interface is managing one or more 'managers' (each one representing a separate Dynamo.exe process) which are doing the I/O with one or more worker threads. Iometer performs Asynchronous I/O - accessing files or block devices (later one allowing to bypass the file system buffers).

Iometer allows the configuration of disk parameters such as the 'Maximum Disk Size', 'Starting Disk Sector' and '# of Outstanding I/Os'. This allows a user to configure a test file upon which the 'Access Specifications' configure the I/O types to the file. Configurable items within the Access Specifications are:

- Transfer Request Size
- Percent Random/Sequential distribution.
- Percent Read/Write Distribution
- Aligned I/O's.
- Reply Size
- TCP/IP status
- Burstiness.

In conjunction with the Access Specifications, Iometer allows the specifications to be cycled with incrementing outstanding I/O's, either exponentially or linearly. The tool outputs 50 parameters into a .CSV file, allowing multiple applications to analyse and generate graphs and reports on the measured performance.

== See also ==
- DiskSpd
