= Memory ProteXion =

Computer memory technology

For computer memory, Memory ProteXion, found in IBM xSeries servers, is a form of "redundant bit steering". This technology uses redundant bits in a data packet to recover from a DIMM failure.

Memory ProteXion is different from normal ECC error correction in that it uses only 6 bits for ECC, leaving 2 bits behind. These 2 bits can be used to re-route data from failed memory, much like hot spare on a RAID. The ECC is used to reconstruct the data, and the extra bits to store it.

Memory ProteXion, also known as “redundant bit steering”, is the technology behind using redundant bits in a data packet to provide backup in the event of a DIMM failure. One failure does not cause a predictive failure analysis to be issued on the DIMM, but 2 failures and more will issue a PFA to inform the system administrator that a replacement is needed.

== See also ==
- Chipkill
