= Power-on hours =

Length of time that electrical power is applied to a device

Power-on hours (POH) is the length of time, usually in hours, that electrical power is applied to a device.

A part of the S.M.A.R.T. attributes are used to predict drive failure, supported on almost all hard disk drives and SSDs.

Power-on hours is intended to indicate a remaining lifetime prediction for hard drives and solid state drives. Generally, the total expected life-time of a hard disk is 5 years or 43,800 hours of constant use.

Typically, after a disk reaches 5 years or 43,800 hours of power-on time, it is no longer in perfect condition and therefore is more likely to fail. However, some devices can still work perfectly fine. Some devices have even reached more than 10 years of power-on time without showing any problems or errors.

Google tested over 100,000 consumer grade serial and parallel ATA hard disks, finding evidence that S.M.A.R.T. attributes like POH played a heavy role in device failures.
