= Molecular memory =

Molecular memory is a term for data storage technologies that use molecular species as the data storage element, rather than e.g. circuits, magnetics, inorganic materials or physical shapes. The molecular component can be described as a molecular switch, and may perform this function by any of several mechanisms, including charge storage, photochromism, or changes in capacitance. In a perfect molecular memory device, each individual molecule contains a bit of data, leading to massive data capacity. However, practical devices are more likely to use large numbers of molecules for each bit, in the manner of 3D optical data storage (many examples of which can be considered molecular memory devices). The term "molecular memory" is most often used to mean very fast, electronically addressed solid-state data storage, as is the term computer memory. At present, molecular memories are still found only in laboratories.

== Examples ==
One approach to molecular memories is based on special compounds such as porphyrin-based polymers which are capable of storing electric charge. Once a certain voltage threshold is achieved the material oxidizes, releasing an electric charge. The process is reversible, in effect creating an electric capacitor. The properties of the material allow for a much greater capacitance per unit area than with conventional DRAM memory, thus potentially leading to smaller and cheaper integrated circuits.

Several universities and a number of companies (Hewlett-Packard, ZettaCore) have announced work on molecular memories, which some hope will supplant DRAM memory as the lowest cost technology for high-speed computer memory. NASA is also supporting research on non-volatile molecular memories.

In 2018, researches from the University of Jyväskylä in Finland, developed a molecular memory which can memorize the direction of a magnetic field for long periods of time after being switched off at extremely low temperatures, which would aid in enhancing the storage capacity of hard disk drives without enlarging their physical size.
