= Self-Monitoring, Analysis and Reporting Technology =

Monitoring system in computer drives

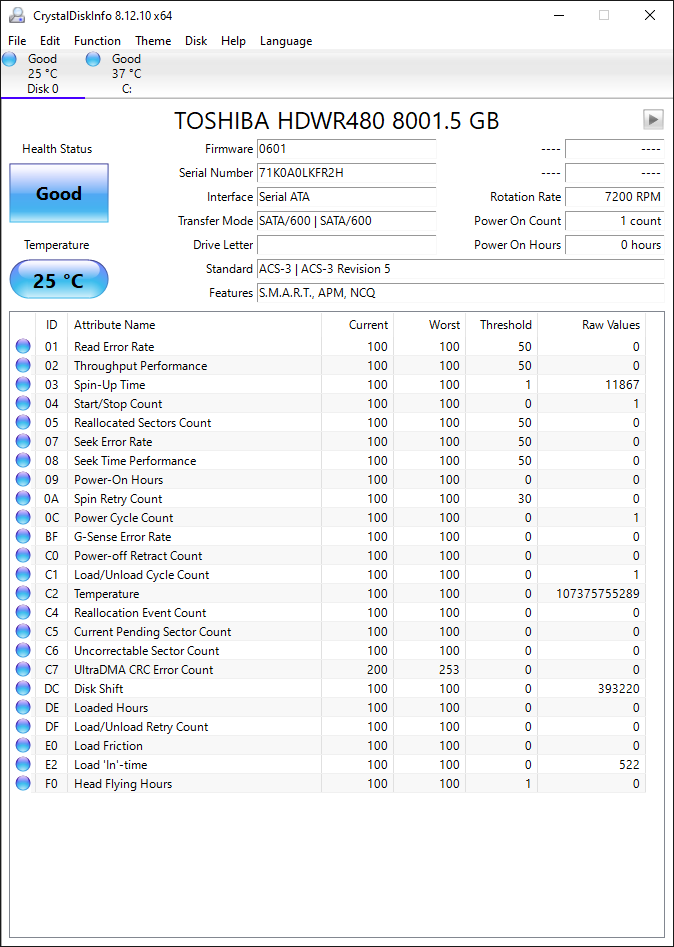
An example of software that shows the health of the drive and its smart attributes. This 8TB Toshiba Hard Drive appears to be in perfect condition, unformatted, and unused before this demonstration.

Self-Monitoring, Analysis, and Reporting Technology (contrived acronym S.M.A.R.T. or SMART) is a monitoring system included in computer hard disk drives (HDDs) and solid-state drives (SSDs). Its primary function is to detect and report various indicators of drive reliability, or how long a drive can function while anticipating imminent hardware failures.

When S.M.A.R.T. data indicates a possible imminent drive failure, software running on the host system may notify the user so action can be taken to prevent data loss, and the failing drive can be replaced without any loss of data.

== Background ==
Hard disk and other storage drives are subject to failures (see hard disk drive failure) which can be classified into two basic classes:

- Predictable failures which result from slow processes such as mechanical wear and gradual degradation of storage surfaces. Monitoring can determine when such failures are becoming more likely.
- Unpredictable failures which occur without warning due to anything from electronic components becoming defective to a sudden mechanical failure, including failures related to improper handling.

Mechanical failures account for about 60% of all drive failures. While the eventual failure may be catastrophic, most mechanical failures result from gradual wear and there are usually certain indications that failure is imminent. These may include increased heat output, increased noise level, problems with reading and writing of data, or an increase in the number of damaged disk sectors.

PCTechGuide's page on S.M.A.R.T. (2003) comments that the technology has gone through three phases:

In its original incarnation SMART provided failure prediction by monitoring certain online hard drive activities. A subsequent version improved failure prediction by adding an automatic off-line read scan to monitor additional operations. The latest SMART technology not only monitors hard drive activities but adds failure prevention by attempting to detect and repair sector errors. Also, whilst earlier versions of the technology only monitored hard drive activity for data that was retrieved by the operating system, this latest SMART tests all data and all sectors of a drive by using off-line data collection to confirm the drive's health during periods of inactivity.

=== Accuracy ===
A field study at Google covering over 100,000 consumer-grade drives from December 2005 to August 2006 found correlations between certain S.M.A.R.T. information and annualized failure rates:

- In the 60 days following the first uncorrectable error on a drive (S.M.A.R.T. attribute 0xC6 or 198) detected as a result of an offline scan, the drive was, on average, 39 times more likely to fail than a similar drive for which no such error occurred.
- First errors in reallocations, offline reallocations (S.M.A.R.T. attributes 0xC4 and 0x05 or 196 and 5) and probational counts (S.M.A.R.T. attribute 0xC5 or 197) were also strongly correlated to higher probabilities of failure.
- Conversely, little correlation was found for increased temperature and no correlation for usage level. However, the research showed that a large proportion (56%) of the failed drives failed without recording any count in the "four strong S.M.A.R.T. warnings" identified as scan errors, reallocation count, offline reallocation, and probational count.
- Further, 36% of failed drives did so without recording any S.M.A.R.T. error at all, except the temperature, meaning that S.M.A.R.T. data alone was of limited usefulness in anticipating failures.

== History and predecessors ==
An early hard disk monitoring technology was introduced by IBM in 1992 in its IBM 9337 Disk Arrays for AS/400 servers using IBM 0662 SCSI-2 disk drives. Later it was named predictive failure analysis (PFA) technology. It was measuring several key device health parameters and evaluating them within the drive firmware. Communications between the physical unit and the monitoring software were limited to a binary result: namely, either "device is OK" or "drive is likely to fail soon".

Later, another variant, which was named IntelliSafe, was created by computer manufacturer Compaq and disk drive manufacturers Seagate, Quantum, and Conner. The disk drives would measure the disk's "health parameters", and the values would be transferred to the operating system and user-space monitoring software. Each disk drive vendor was free to decide which parameters were to be included for monitoring, and what their thresholds should be. The unification was at the protocol level with the host.

Compaq submitted IntelliSafe to the Small Form Factor (SFF) committee for standardization in early 1995. It was supported by IBM, by Compaq's development partners Seagate, Quantum, and Conner, and by Western Digital, which did not have a failure prediction system at the time. The Committee chose IntelliSafe's approach, as it provided more flexibility. Compaq placed IntelliSafe into the public domain on 12 May 1995. The resulting jointly developed standard was named S.M.A.R.T..

That SFF standard described a communication protocol for an ATA host to use and control monitoring and analysis in a hard disk drive, but did not specify any particular metrics or analysis methods. Later, "S.M.A.R.T." came to be understood (though without any formal specification) to refer to a variety of specific metrics and methods and to apply to protocols unrelated to ATA for communicating the same kinds of things.

== Provided information ==
The technical documentation for S.M.A.R.T. is in the AT Attachment (ATA) standard. First introduced in 1994, the ATA standard has gone through multiple revisions. Some parts of the original S.M.A.R.T. specification by the Small Form Factor (SFF) Committee were added to ATA-3, published in 1997. In 1998 ATA-4 dropped the requirement for drives to maintain an internal attribute table and instead required only for an "OK" or "NOT OK" value to be returned. Albeit, manufacturers have kept the capability to retrieve the attributes' value. The most recent ATA standard, ATA-8, was published in 2004. It has undergone regular revisions, the latest being in 2011. Standardization of similar features on SCSI is more scarce and is not named as such on standards, although vendors and consumers alike do refer to these similar features as S.M.A.R.T. too.

The most basic information that S.M.A.R.T. provides is the S.M.A.R.T. status. It provides only two values: "threshold not exceeded" and "threshold exceeded". Often, these are represented as "drive OK" or "drive fail" respectively. A "threshold exceeded" value is intended to indicate that there is a relatively high probability that the drive will not be able to honor its specification in the future: that is, the drive is "about to fail". The predicted failure may be catastrophic or may be something as subtle as the inability to write to certain sectors, or perhaps slower performance than the manufacturer's declared minimum.

The S.M.A.R.T. status does not necessarily indicate the drive's past or present reliability. If a drive has already failed catastrophically, the S.M.A.R.T. status may be inaccessible. Alternatively, if a drive has experienced problems in the past, but the sensors no longer detect such problems, the S.M.A.R.T. status may, depending on the manufacturer's programming, suggest that the drive is now healthy.

The inability to read some sectors is not always an indication that a drive is about to fail. One way that unreadable sectors may be created, even when the drive is functioning within specification, is through a sudden power failure while the drive is writing. Also, even if the physical disk is damaged at one location, such that a certain sector is unreadable, the disk may be able to use spare space to replace the bad area, so that the sector can be overwritten.

More detail on the health of the drive may be obtained by examining the S.M.A.R.T. Attributes. S.M.A.R.T. Attributes were included in some drafts of the ATA standard, but were removed before the standard became final. The meaning and interpretation of the attributes varies between manufacturers, and are sometimes considered a trade secret for one manufacturer or another. Attributes are further discussed below.

Drives with S.M.A.R.T. may optionally maintain a number of 'logs'. The error log records information about the most recent errors that the drive has reported back to the host computer. Examining this log may help one to determine whether computer problems are disk-related or caused by something else (error log timestamps may "wrap" after 2^{32} ms=49.71 days).

A drive that implements S.M.A.R.T. may optionally implement a number of self-test or maintenance routines, and the results of the tests are kept in the self-test log. The self-test routines may be used to detect any unreadable sectors on the disk, so that they may be restored from back-up sources (for example, from other disks in a RAID). This helps to reduce the risk of incurring permanent loss of data.

== Standards and implementation ==
=== Lack of common interpretation ===
Many motherboards display a warning message upon boot when a disk drive is approaching failure. Although an industry standard exists among most major hard drive manufacturers, issues remain due to attributes intentionally left undocumented to the public in order to differentiate models between manufacturers. From a legal perspective, the term "S.M.A.R.T." refers only to a signaling method between internal disk drive electromechanical sensors and the host computer. Because of this the specifications of S.M.A.R.T. are entirely vendor specific and, while many of these attributes have been standardized between drive vendors, others remain vendor-specific. S.M.A.R.T. implementations still differ and in some cases may lack "common" or expected features such as a temperature sensor or only include a few select attributes while still allowing the manufacturer to advertise the product as "S.M.A.R.T. compatible."

=== Visibility to host systems ===
Depending on the type of interface being used, some S.M.A.R.T.-enabled motherboards and related software may not communicate with certain S.M.A.R.T.-capable drives. For example, few external drives connected via USB and FireWire correctly send S.M.A.R.T. data over those interfaces. With so many ways to connect a hard drive (SCSI, Fibre Channel, ATA, SATA, SAS, SSA, NVMe and so on), it is difficult to predict whether S.M.A.R.T. reports will function correctly in a given system.

Even with a hard drive and interface that implements the specification, the computer's operating system may not see the S.M.A.R.T. information because the drive and interface are encapsulated in a lower layer. For example, they may be part of a RAID subsystem in which the RAID controller sees the S.M.A.R.T.-capable drive, but the host computer sees only a logical volume generated by the RAID controller.

On the Windows platform, many programs designed to monitor and report S.M.A.R.T. information will function only under an administrator account.

BIOS and Windows (Windows Vista and later) may detect S.M.A.R.T. status of hard disk drives and solid state drives, and give a prompt if the S.M.A.R.T. status is bad.

== In ATA ==
=== ATA S.M.A.R.T. attributes ===
Each drive manufacturer defines a set of attributes, and sets threshold values beyond which attributes should not pass under normal operation. Counter-intuitively the rule of thumb is that higher current values than the threshold are good, i.e. do not exceed the threshold.

Each attribute has:

- 1 byte for the ID (1 through 254).
- 1 byte for status flags.
- 1 byte of threshold value, which ranges from 0 to 254.
- 1 byte of normalized value aka current value, which ranges from 0 to 254 (higher is usually better, but vendors are allowed to vary; the threshold entry stored elsewhere describes which direction is better). The initial normalized value of attributes is 100 but can vary between manufacturer.
- 8 bytes "vendor-specific".

However, the full "vendor-specific" attribute is not used as-is. Instead, one of the following occurs:
- In the 7-byte setup, the first byte of "vendor-specific" is used to store a "worst" normalized value, leaving 7 bytes for vendor data.
- In the 6-byte setup, the first byte of "vendor-specific" is used to store a "worst" normalized value and the last byte "reserved", leaving 6 bytes.
- In the 8-byte setup, the normalized byte is added to the attribute while the last byte is reserved.

The vendor attribute, also commonly called a "raw value", may be displayed as a decimal or hexadecimal number; its meaning is entirely up to the drive manufacturer (but often corresponds to counts or a physical unit, such as degrees Celsius or seconds).

If one or more attributes have the "prefailure" flag, and the "current value" of such prefailure attribute is smaller than or equal to its "threshold value" (unless the "threshold value" is 0), that will be reported as a "drive failure". In addition, a utility software can send SMART RETURN STATUS command to the ATA drive, it may report three status: "drive OK", "drive warning" or "drive failure".

Manufacturers that have implemented at least one S.M.A.R.T. attribute in various products include Samsung, Seagate, IBM (Hitachi), Fujitsu, Maxtor, Toshiba, Intel, sTec, Inc., Western Digital and ExcelStor Technology.

==== Known ATA S.M.A.R.T. attributes ====
The following chart lists some S.M.A.R.T. attributes and the typical meaning of their raw values. Normalized values are usually mapped so that higher values are better (exceptions include drive temperature, number of head load/unload cycles), but higher raw attribute values may be better or worse depending on the attribute and manufacturer. For example, the "Reallocated Sectors Count" attribute's normalized value decreases as the count of reallocated sectors increases. In this case, the attribute's raw value will often indicate the actual count of sectors that were reallocated, although vendors are in no way required to adhere to this convention.

As manufacturers do not necessarily agree on precise attribute definitions and measurement units, the following list of attributes is a general guide only.

Drives do not support all attribute codes (sometimes abbreviated as "ID", for "identifier", in tables). Some codes are specific to particular drive types (magnetic platter, flash, SSD). Drives may use different codes for the same parameter, e.g., see codes 193 and 225.

Legend
ID	193; 0xC1	Attribute code in decimal and hexadecimal notations
Ideal	High	Higher raw value is better
Ideal	Low	Lower raw value is better
! (Critical)	Critical	Denotes a Critical attribute. Specific values may predict drive failure

ID	Attribute name	Ideal	!	Description
01; 0x01	Read Error Rate	Low	Critical	(Vendor specific raw value.) Stores data related to the rate of hardware read errors that occurred when reading data from a disk surface. The raw value has different structure for different vendors and is often not meaningful as a decimal number. For some drives, this number may increase during normal operation without necessarily signifying errors.
02; 0x02	Throughput Performance	High		Overall (general) throughput performance of a hard disk drive. If the value of this attribute is decreasing there is a high probability that there is a problem with the disk.
03; 0x03	Spin-Up Time	Low		Average time of spindle spin up (from zero RPM to fully operational [milliseconds]).
04; 0x04	Start/Stop Count			A tally of spindle start/stop cycles. The spindle turns on, and hence the count is increased, both when the hard disk is turned on after having before been turned entirely off (disconnected from power source) and when the hard disk returns from having previously been put to sleep mode.
05; 0x05	Reallocated Sectors Count	Low	Critical	Count of reallocated sectors. The raw value represents a count of the bad sectors that have been found and remapped. Thus, the higher the attribute value, the more sectors the drive has had to reallocate. This value is primarily used as a metric of the life expectancy of the drive; a drive which has had any reallocations at all is significantly more likely to fail in the immediate months. If Raw value of 0x05 attribute is higher than its Threshold value, that will reported as "drive warning".
06; 0x06	Read Channel Margin			Margin of a channel while reading data. The function of this attribute is not specified.
07; 0x07	Seek Error Rate	Varies		(Vendor specific raw value.) Rate of seek errors of the magnetic heads. If there is a partial failure in the mechanical positioning system, then seek errors will arise. Such a failure may be due to numerous factors, such as damage to a servo, or thermal widening of the hard disk. The raw value has different structure for different vendors and is often not meaningful as a decimal number. For some drives, this number may increase during normal operation without necessarily signifying errors.
08; 0x08	Seek Time Performance	High		Average performance of seek operations of the magnetic heads. If this attribute is decreasing, it is a sign of problems in the mechanical subsystem.
09; 0x09	Power-On Hours			Count of hours in power-on state. The raw value of this attribute shows total count of hours (or minutes, or seconds, depending on manufacturer) in power-on state. "By default, the total expected lifetime of a hard disk in perfect condition is defined as 5 years (running every day and night on all days). This is equal to 1825 days in 24/7 mode or 43800 hours." On some pre-2005 drives, this raw value may advance erratically and/or "wrap around" (reset to zero periodically). For some HDDs it might be stored as an unsigned 16-bit integer, which would cause it to wrap around after 65535.
10; 0x0A	Spin Retry Count	Low	Critical	Count of retry of spin start attempts. This attribute stores a total count of the spin start attempts to reach the fully operational speed (under the condition that the first attempt was unsuccessful). An increase of this attribute value is a sign of problems in the hard disk mechanical subsystem.
11; 0x0B	Recalibration Retries or Calibration Retry Count	Low		This attribute indicates the count that recalibration was requested (under the condition that the first attempt was unsuccessful). An increase of this attribute value is a sign of problems in the hard disk mechanical subsystem.
12; 0x0C	Power Cycle Count			This attribute indicates the count of full hard disk power on/off cycles.
13; 0x0D	Soft Read Error Rate	Low		Uncorrected read errors reported to the operating system.
22; 0x16	Current Helium Level	High		Specific to He8 drives from HGST. This value measures the helium inside of the drive specific to this manufacturer. It is a pre-fail attribute that trips once the drive detects that the internal environment is out of specification.
23; 0x17	Helium Condition Lower			Specific to MG07+ drives from Toshiba. These values measures level of helium inside of the drive specific to this manufacturer. It is a pre-fail attribute that trips once the drive detects that the internal environment is out of specification.
24; 0x18	Helium Condition Upper			Specific to MG07+ drives from Toshiba. These values measures level of helium inside of the drive specific to this manufacturer. It is a pre-fail attribute that trips once the drive detects that the internal environment is out of specification.
170; 0xAA	Available Reserved Space			See attribute E8.
171; 0xAB	SSD Program Fail Count			(Kingston) The total number of flash program operation failures since the drive was deployed. Identical to attribute 181.
172; 0xAC	SSD Erase Fail Count			(Kingston) Counts the number of flash erase failures. This attribute returns the total number of Flash erase operation failures since the drive was deployed. This attribute is identical to attribute 182.
173; 0xAD	SSD Wear Leveling Count			Counts the maximum worst erase count on any block.
174; 0xAE	Unexpected Power Loss Count			Also known as "Power-off Retract Count" per conventional HDD terminology. Raw value reports the number of unclean shutdowns, cumulative over the life of an SSD, where an "unclean shutdown" is the removal of power without STANDBY IMMEDIATE as the last command (regardless of PLI activity using capacitor power). Normalized value is always 100.
175; 0xAF	Power Loss Protection Failure			Last test result as microseconds to discharge cap, saturated at its maximum value. Also logs minutes since last test and lifetime number of tests. Raw value contains the following data: Bytes 0-1: Last test result as microseconds to discharge cap, saturates at max value. Test result expected in range 25 <= result <= 5000000, lower indicates specific error code.; Bytes 2-3: Minutes since last test, saturates at max value.; Bytes 4-5: Lifetime number of tests, not incremented on power cycle, saturates at max value.; Normalized value is set to one on test failure or 11 if the capacitor has been tested in an excessive temperature condition, otherwise 100.
176; 0xB0	Erase Fail Count			S.M.A.R.T. parameter indicates a number of flash erase command failures.
177; 0xB1	Wear Range Delta			Delta between most-worn and least-worn Flash blocks. It describes how good/bad the wearleveling of the SSD works on a more technical way.
178; 0xB2	Used Reserved Block Count			"Pre-Fail" attribute used at least in Samsung devices.
179; 0xB3	Used Reserved Block Count Total			"Pre-Fail" attribute used at least in Samsung devices.
180; 0xB4	Unused Reserved Block Count Total			"Pre-Fail" attribute used at least in HP devices. If the value drops to 0 the device may become read-only to allow the user to retrieve stored data.
181; 0xB5	Program Fail Count Total or Non-4K Aligned Access Count	Low		(Flash Memory) Total number of Flash program operation failures since the drive was deployed (indicating old age). (HDD, Advanced Format) Number of user data accesses (both reads and writes) where LBAs are not 4 KiB aligned (LBA % 8 != 0) or where size is not modulus 4 KiB (block count != 8), assuming logical block size (LBS)=512 B (indicating bad software configuration).
182; 0xB6	Erase Fail Count			"Pre-Fail" Attribute used at least in Samsung devices.
183; 0xB7	SATA Downshift Error Count or Runtime Bad Block	Low		Western Digital, Samsung or Seagate attribute: Either the number of downshifts of link speed (e.g. from 6Gbit/s to 3Gbit/s) or the total number of data blocks with detected, uncorrectable errors encountered during normal operation. Although degradation of this parameter can be an indicator of drive aging and/or potential electromechanical problems, it does not directly indicate imminent drive failure.
184; 0xB8	End-to-End error / IOEDC	Low	Critical	This attribute is a part of Hewlett-Packard's SMART IV technology, as well as part of other vendors' IO Error Detection and Correction schemas, and it contains a count of parity errors which occur in the data path to the media via the drive's cache RAM.
185; 0xB9	Head Stability			Western Digital attribute.
186; 0xBA	Induced Op-Vibration Detection			Western Digital attribute.
187; 0xBB	Reported Uncorrectable Errors	Low	Critical	The count of errors that could not be recovered using hardware ECC (see attribute 195).
188; 0xBC	Command Timeout	Low	Critical	The count of aborted operations due to HDD timeout. Normally this attribute value should be equal to zero.
189; 0xBD	High Fly Writes	Low		HDD manufacturers implement a flying height sensor that attempts to provide additional protections for write operations by detecting when a recording head is flying outside its normal operating range. If an unsafe fly height condition is encountered, the write process is stopped, and the information is rewritten or reallocated to a safe region of the hard drive. This attribute indicates the count of these errors detected over the lifetime of the drive. This feature is implemented in most modern Seagate drives and some of Western Digital's drives, beginning with the WD Enterprise WDE18300 and WDE9180 Ultra2 SCSI hard drives, and will be included on all future WD Enterprise products.
190; 0xBE	Temperature Difference or Airflow Temperature	Varies		Value is equal to (100-temp. °C), allowing manufacturer to set a minimum threshold which corresponds to a maximum temperature. This also follows the convention of 100 being a best-case value and lower values being undesirable. However, some older drives may instead report raw Temperature (identical to 0xC2) or Temperature minus 50 here.
191; 0xBF	G-sense Error Rate	Low		The count of errors resulting from externally induced shock and vibration.
192; 0xC0	Power-off Retract Count, Emergency Retract Cycle Count (Fujitsu), or Unsafe Shutdown Count	Low		Number of power-off or emergency retract cycles.
193; 0xC1	Load Cycle Count or Load/Unload Cycle Count (Fujitsu)	Low		Count of load/unload cycles into head landing zone position. Some drives use 225 (0xE1) for Load Cycle Count instead. Western Digital rates their VelociRaptor drives for 600,000 load/unload cycles, and WD Green drives for 300,000 cycles; the latter ones are designed to unload heads often to conserve power. On the other hand, the WD3000GLFS (a desktop drive) is specified for only 50,000 load/unload cycles. Some laptop drives and "green power" desktop drives are programmed to unload the heads whenever there has not been any activity for a short period, to save power. Operating systems often access the file system a few times a minute in the background, causing 100 or more load cycles per hour if the heads unload: the load cycle rating may be exceeded in less than a year. There are programs for most operating systems that disable the Advanced Power Management (APM) and Automatic acoustic management (AAM) features causing frequent load cycles.
194; 0xC2	Temperature or Temperature Celsius	Low		Indicates the device temperature, if the appropriate sensor is fitted. Lowest byte of the raw value contains the exact temperature value (Celsius degrees).
195; 0xC3	Hardware ECC Recovered	Varies		(Vendor-specific raw value.) The raw value has different structure for different vendors and is often not meaningful as a decimal number. For some drives, this number may increase during normal operation without necessarily signifying errors.
196; 0xC4	Reallocation Event Count	Low	Critical	Count of remap operations. The raw value of this attribute shows the total count of attempts to transfer data from reallocated sectors to a spare area. Both successful and unsuccessful attempts are counted.
197; 0xC5	Current Pending Sector Count	Low	Critical	Count of "unstable" sectors (waiting to be remapped, because of unrecoverable read errors). If an unstable sector is subsequently read successfully, the sector is remapped and this value is decreased. Read errors on a sector will not remap the sector immediately (since the correct value cannot be read and so the value to remap is not known, and also it might become readable later); instead, the drive firmware remembers that the sector needs to be remapped, and will remap it the next time it has been successfully read. However, some drives will not immediately remap such sectors when successfully read; instead the drive will first attempt to write to the problem sector, and if the write operation is successful the sector will then be marked as good (in this case, the "Reallocation Event Count" (0xC4) will not be increased). This is a serious shortcoming, for if such a drive contains marginal sectors that consistently fail only after some time has passed following a successful write operation, then the drive will never remap these problem sectors. If Raw value of 0xC5 attribute is higher than its Threshold value, that will reported as "drive warning".
198; 0xC6	(Offline) Uncorrectable Sector Count	Low	Critical	The total count of uncorrectable errors when reading/writing a sector. A rise in the value of this attribute indicates defects of the disk surface and/or problems in the mechanical subsystem.
199; 0xC7	UltraDMA CRC Error Count	Low		The count of errors in data transfer via the interface cable as determined by ICRC (Interface Cyclic Redundancy Check).
200; 0xC8	Multi-Zone Error Rate	Low		The count of errors found when writing a sector. The higher the value, the worse the disk's mechanical condition is.
200; 0xC8	Write Error Rate (Fujitsu)	Low		The total count of errors when writing a sector.
201; 0xC9	Soft Read Error Rate or TA Counter Detected	Low	Critical	Count indicates the number of uncorrectable software read errors.
202; 0xCA	Data Address Mark errors or TA Counter Increased	Low		Count of Data Address Mark errors (or vendor-specific).
203; 0xCB	Run Out Cancel	Low		The number of errors caused by incorrect checksum during the error correction.
204; 0xCC	Soft ECC Correction	Low		Count of errors corrected by the internal error correction software.
205; 0xCD	Thermal Asperity Rate	Low		Count of errors due to high temperature.
206; 0xCE	Flying Height			Height of heads above the disk surface. If too low, head crash is more likely; if too high, read/write errors are more likely.
207; 0xCF	Spin High Current	Low		Amount of surge current used to spin up the drive.
208; 0xD0	Spin Buzz			Count of buzz routines needed to spin up the drive due to insufficient power.
209; 0xD1	Offline Seek Performance			Drive's seek performance during its internal tests.
210; 0xD2	Vibration During Write			Found in Maxtor 6B200M0 200GB and 2R015H1 15GB disks.
211; 0xD3	Vibration During Write			A recording of a vibration encountered during write operations.
212; 0xD4	Shock During Write			A recording of shock encountered during write operations.
220; 0xDC	Disk Shift	Low		Distance the disk has shifted relative to the spindle (usually due to shock or temperature). Unit of measure is unknown.
221; 0xDD	G-Sense Error Rate	Low		The count of errors resulting from externally induced shock and vibration. More typically reported at 0xBF.
222; 0xDE	Loaded Hours			Time spent operating under data load (movement of magnetic head armature).
223; 0xDF	Load/Unload Retry Count			Count of times head changes position.
224; 0xE0	Load Friction	Low		Resistance caused by friction in mechanical parts while operating.
225; 0xE1	Load/Unload Cycle Count	Low		Total count of load cycles Some drives use 193 (0xC1) for Load Cycle Count instead. See Description for 193 for significance of this number.
226; 0xE2	Load 'In'-time			Total time of loading on the magnetic heads actuator (time not spent in parking area).
227; 0xE3	Torque Amplification Count	Low		Count of attempts to compensate for platter speed variations.
228; 0xE4	Power-Off Retract Cycle	Low		The number of power-off cycles which are counted whenever there is a "retract event" and the heads are loaded off of the media such as when the machine is powered down, put to sleep, or is idle.
230; 0xE6	GMR Head Amplitude (magnetic HDDs), Drive Life Protection Status (SSDs)			Amplitude of "thrashing" (repetitive head moving motions between operations). In solid-state drives, indicates whether usage trajectory is outpacing the expected life curve
231; 0xE7	Life Left (SSDs) or Temperature	High (for Life Left)		Indicates the approximate SSD life left, in terms of program/erase cycles or available reserved blocks. A normalized value of 100 represents a new drive, with a threshold value at 10 indicating a need for replacement. A value of 0 may mean that the drive is operating in read-only mode to allow data recovery. Previously (pre-2010) occasionally used for Drive Temperature (more typically reported at 0xC2).
232; 0xE8	Endurance Remaining or Available Reserved Space	High		Number of physical erase cycles completed on the SSD as a percentage of the maximum physical erase cycles the drive is designed to endure. Intel SSDs report the available reserved space as a percentage of the initial reserved space.
233; 0xE9	Media Wearout Indicator (SSDs) or Power-On Hours			Intel SSDs report a normalized value from 100, a new drive, to a minimum of 1. It decreases while the NAND erase cycles increase from 0 to the maximum-rated cycles. Previously (pre-2010) occasionally used for Power-On Hours (more typically reported in 0x09).
234; 0xEA	Average erase count AND Maximum Erase Count			Decoded as: byte 0-1-2=average erase count (big endian) and byte 3-4-5=max erase count (big endian).
235; 0xEB	Good Block Count AND System(Free) Block Count			Decoded as: byte 0-1-2=good block count (big endian) and byte 3-4=system (free) block count.
240; 0xF0	Head Flying Hours or 'Transfer Error Rate' (Fujitsu)			Time spent during the positioning of the drive heads. Some Fujitsu drives report the count of link resets during a data transfer.
241; 0xF1	Total LBAs Written or Total Host Writes			Total count of LBAs written. Some SSD (for example, manufacture by Western Digital and Seagate) use 1 GiB as unit of this attribute.
242; 0xF2	Total LBAs Read or Total Host Reads			Total count of LBAs read. Some S.M.A.R.T. utilities will report a negative number for the raw value since in reality it has 48 bits rather than 32. Some SSD (for example, manufacture by Western Digital and Seagate) use 1 GiB as unit of this attribute.
243; 0xF3	Total LBAs Written Expanded or Total Host Writes Expanded			The upper 5 bytes of the 12-byte total number of LBAs written to the device. The lower 7 byte value is located at attribute 0xF1.
244; 0xF4	Total LBAs Read Expanded or Total Host Reads Expanded			The upper 5 bytes of the 12-byte total number of LBAs read from the device. The lower 7 byte value is located at attribute 0xF2.
245 0xF5	Remaining Rated Write Endurance	High		Certified Dell SSDs use this for write endurance.
246; 0xF6	Cumulative host sectors written			(Micron) LBA written due to computer request.
247; 0xF7	Host program page count			(Micron) NAND pages written due to computer request.
248; 0xF8	Background program page count			(Micron) NAND pages written due to background operations (e.g. garbage collection).
249; 0xF9	NAND Writes (1GiB)			Total NAND Writes. Raw value reports the number of writes to NAND in 1 GB increments.
250; 0xFA	Read Error Retry Rate	Low		Count of errors while reading from a disk.
251; 0xFB	Minimum Spares Remaining			The Minimum Spares Remaining attribute indicates the number of remaining spare blocks as a percentage of the total number of spare blocks available.
252; 0xFC	Newly Added Bad Flash Block			The Newly Added Bad Flash Block attribute indicates the total number of bad flash blocks the drive detected since it was first initialized in manufacturing.
254; 0xFE	Free Fall Protection	Low		Count of "Free Fall Events" detected.

=== Logs ===
GP Log 0x04: Device Statistics
Page	Offset	Description
0x01	0x08	Lifetime Power-On Resets
0x01	0x10	Power-on Hours
0x01	0x18	Logical Sectors Written
0x01	0x28	Logical Sectors Read
0x05	0x08	Current Temperature
0x05	0x20	Highest Temperature
0x05	0x28	Lowest Temperature
0x05	0x58	Specified Maximum Operating Temperature
0x05	0x68	Specified Minimum Operating Temperature
0x07	0x08	Percentage Used Endurance Indicator

=== Threshold Exceeds Condition ===
Threshold Exceeds Condition (TEC) is an estimated date when a critical drive statistic attribute will reach its threshold value. When Drive Health software reports a "Nearest T.E.C.", it should be regarded as a "Failure date". Sometimes, no date is given and the drive can be expected to work without errors.

To predict the date, the drive tracks the rate at which the attribute changes. Note that TEC dates are only estimates; hard drives can and do fail much sooner or much later than the TEC date.

== In NVMe ==
NVMe specification has defined unified S.M.A.R.T. attributes for different drive manufacturers. The data is present in a log page of 512 bytes long.

=== Known NVMe S.M.A.R.T. attributes ===
Offset	Length	Attribute name	Description
0; 0x00	1	Critical Warning	Critical warnings or drive failures of the controller. Bit definition: Bit 00, value 1: Available spare is below threshold. Bit 01, value 1: Temperature is over threshold. Bit 02, value 1: Drive reliability is degraded. Bit 03, value 1: Drive is in read only mode. Bit 04, value 1: Volatile memory backup device failed. This usually means power-loss protection capacitor.
1; 0x01	2	Composite Temperature	Temperature in kelvins representing the current composite temperature of the controller and its namespace(s).
3; 0x03	1	Available Spare	Percentage of available spare space (usually the static over-provisioning space).
4; 0x04	1	Available Spare Threshold	Percentage of available spare space threshold.
5; 0x05	1	Percentage Used	Percentage of drive life used. This drive life may be estimated as terabytes written.
7; 0x07	25	Reserved	
32; 0x20	16	Data Units Read	Number of 512-byte data units the host has read from the controller. This value does not include metadata. This value is reported in thousands (i.e., a value of 1 corresponds to 1000 units of 512 bytes written) and is rounded up.
48; 0x30	16	Data Units Written	Number of 512-byte data units the host has written to the controller. This value does not include metadata. This value is reported in thousands (i.e., a value of 1 corresponds to 1000 units of 512 bytes written) and is rounded up.
64; 0x40	16	Host Read Commands	Number of read commands completed by the controller.
80; 0x50	16	Host Write Commands	Number of write commands completed by the controller.
96; 0x60	16	Controller Busy Time	Amount of time the controller is busy with I/O commands.
112; 0x70	16	Power Cycles	Number of power cycles.
128; 0x80	16	Power On Hours	Number of power-on hours, excluding time powered on in non-operational power state.
144; 0x90	16	Unsafe Shutdowns	Number of unsafe shutdowns. Incremented when a Shutdown Notification is not received prior to loss of power.
160; 0xA0	16	Media Errors	Number of occurrences where the controller detected an unrecovered data integrity error, including uncorrectable ECC, CRC checksum failure, or LBA tag mismatch.
176; 0xB0	16	Number of Error Information Log Entries	Number of Error Information log entries over the life of the controller.
192; 0xC0	4	Warning Composite Temperature Time	The amount of time in minutes that the controller is operational and the Composite Temperature is greater than or equal to the Warning Composite Temperature Threshold and less than the Critical Composite Temperature Threshold.
196; 0xC4	4	Critical Composite Temperature Time	Contains the amount of time in minutes that the controller is operational and the Composite Temperature is greater than or equal to the Critical Composite Temperature Threshold.
200; 0xC8	2×8	Temperature Sensor 1–8	
216; 0xD8	4×2	Thermal Management Temperature 1/2 Transition Count	
224; 0xE0	4×2	Total Time For Thermal Management Temperature 1/2	
232; 0xE8	280	Reserved	

== In SCSI ==
The SCSI standard does not mention the term "S.M.A.R.T." except in one place, but the equivalent logging/failure-prediction functionality is available in standard log pages prescribed by SPC-4. There is also space for vendor-specific log pages. Log pages are variable-length.

List of SCSI log pages
Code	Name	Description
00h	Supported log pages	
01h	Buffer Over-Run/Under-Run	
02h	Write Error Counter	
03h	Read Error Counter	
04h	Read Reverse Error Counter	
05h	Verify Error Counter	
06h	Non-Medium Error	
07h	Last n Error Events	
0Bh	Last n Deferred Errors or Asynchronous Event	
0Dh	Temperature	
0Eh	Start-Stop Cycle Counter	
0Fh	Application Client	
10h	Self-Test Results	
15h	Background Scan Results	
18h	Protocol Specific Port	
2Fh	Informational Exceptions	Provides two kinds of warnings: impending failure warning based on a vendor-defined threshold (similar to ATA SMART normalized values) and temperature warnings.

SCSI has a specialized set of S.M.A.R.T. features for tape drives known as TapeAlert defined in SMC-2. SCSI offers self-testing, similar to ATA.

Information related to the reallocation of bad sectors is provided not via a log page, but via the READ DEFECT DATA command. In addition to a grand total, this command provides information about which specific sectors were allocated and why.

== Self-tests ==
S.M.A.R.T. drives may offer a number of self-tests:

Short
Checks the electrical and mechanical performance as well as the read performance of the disk. Electrical tests might include a test of buffer RAM, a read/write circuitry test, or a test of the read/write head elements. Mechanical test includes seeking and servo on data tracks. Scans small parts of the drive's surface (area is vendor-specific and there is a time limit on the test). Checks the list of pending sectors that may have read errors, and it usually takes under two minutes.
Long/extended
A longer and more thorough version of the short self-test, scanning the entire disk surface with no time limit. This test usually takes several hours, depending on the read/write speed of the drive and its size. It is possible for the long test to pass even if the short test fails.
Conveyance
Intended as a quick test to identify damage incurred during transporting of the device from the drive manufacturer to the computer manufacturer. Only available on ATA drives, and it usually takes several minutes.
Selective
Some ATA drives allow selective self-tests of just a part of the surface. There is a dedicated log for selective test results, separate from the main self-test log.
Background scan
SCSI drives have the ability to schedule periodic full-surface self-tests known as a background media scan (BMS). The sdparm program may be used to adjust whether to run the scans (EN_BMS) and various parameters for the scan (e.g. period, idle time before run). The drive remains operable during the test. There is a dedicated log for background scan results, separate from the self-test log.
Offline data collection
ATA drives may support a periodic short operation called "offline data collection". Although this feature is marked "obsolete", many modern hard drives retain this feature. The drive remains operable during collection and any result is reflected only in SMART attributes (some attributes only update when "offline").

Drives remain operable during self-test, unless a "captive" option (ATA only) is requested.

The self-test logs for SCSI and ATA drives are slightly different.

The ATA drive's self-test log can contain up to 21 read-only entries. When the log is filled, old entries are removed.

== Controversy ==
The S.M.A.R.T. information may be cleared or modified with the firmware mass production tools, but actually depends on the controller and the hard disk drive / solid-state drive model. This is usually only seen in developing markets (such as China and India).

== See also ==
- Comparison of S.M.A.R.T. tools
- Data scrubbing
- Disk utility
- List of disk partitioning software
- Optical disc § Surface error scanning
- Predictive failure analysis
- System monitor
