= Libevent =

Software library

libevent
- Developers: Azat Khuzhin, Mark Ellzey, Nick Mathewson, Niels Provos
- Release: April 9, 2002; 24 years ago
- Stable release: 2.1.13 / 1 July 2026; 3 months ago
- Written in: C
- Operating system: Cross-platform
- Platform: Unix-like, Windows, OS X
- Type: Network Library
- License: BSD
- Website: libevent.org
- Repository: github.com/libevent/libevent

libevent is a software library that provides asynchronous event notification. The libevent API provides a mechanism to execute a callback function when a specific event occurs on a file descriptor or after a timeout has been reached. libevent also supports callbacks triggered by signals and regular timeouts.

libevent is meant to replace the event loop found in event-driven network servers. An application can just call event_dispatch() and then add or remove events dynamically without having to change the event loop.

Currently, libevent supports /dev/poll, kqueue(2), POSIX select(2), Windows IOCP, poll(2), epoll(7) and Solaris event ports. It also has experimental support for real-time signals. The exposed event API is uniform over all of the supported platforms. As a result, libevent allows for portable application development and provides "the most scalable event notification mechanism available on an operating system".

Using callbacks on signals, libevent makes it possible to write "secure" signal handlers as none of the user supplied signal handling code runs in the signal's context.

libevent was created by Niels Provos, and is maintained primarily by Azat Khuzhin. It is released under a BSD license. The scalable input/output multiplexing techniques underlying libevent grew out of earlier research by Provos into Linux network server performance, including a redesigned poll() interface and an evaluation of the POSIX real-time signal API, described together with Chuck Lever at the 2000 USENIX Annual Technical Conference. Provos first presented libevent itself at the Libre Software Meeting in Metz, France, in July 2003.

== Notable applications ==
Some of the notable applications that take advantage of libevent are:

- Chromium: Google's open-source web browser
- memcached: a high-performance, distributed memory object caching system
- Transmission: a fast, easy, and free BitTorrent client
- NTP: the network time protocol that makes your clock right (uses libevent in SNTP)
- tmux: a terminal multiplexer
- Tor: an anonymous Internet communication system

== Alternatives ==
- libev
- libuv
- FAM
- Boost Asio

== Major version releases ==
- libevent 2.1 was released on April 3, 2012.
- libevent 2.0 was released on April 17, 2009.
- libevent 1.4 was released on November 11, 2007.
- libevent 1.3 was released on February 15, 2007.
- libevent 1.2 was released on October 15, 2006.
- libevent 1.1 was released on May 14, 2005.
