= Libuv =

Software library for asynchronous I/O

libuv
- Stable release: 1.52.1 / 6 March 2026; 4 months ago
- Written in: C
- Operating system: Cross-platform
- Platform: Linux, Android, Windows and OS X/Darwin, FreeBSD, OpenBSD
- Type: I/O abstraction library
- License: MIT
- Website: libuv.org
- Repository: github.com/libuv/libuv

libuv is a multi-platform C library that provides support for asynchronous I/O based on event loops. It supports epoll(4), kqueue(2), Windows IOCP, Solaris event ports and, since version 1.45.0, Linux io_uring for select asynchronous file operations. It is primarily designed for use in Node.js but is also used by other software projects. It was originally an abstraction around libev or Windows IOCP, as libev does not support IOCP. In node-v0.9.0's version of libuv, the dependency on libev was removed.

== Features ==
From:

- Full-featured event loop backed by epoll, kqueue, IOCP, or event ports
- Asynchronous TCP and UDP sockets
- Asynchronous DNS resolution
- Asynchronous file and file system operations
- File system events
- ANSI escape code controlled TTY
- IPC with socket sharing, using Unix domain sockets or named pipes (Windows)
- Child processes
- Thread pool
- Signal handling
- High resolution clock
- Threading and synchronization primitives

== Origin of the name ==
According to libuv developer Ben Noordhuis, the name libuv originally had no specific meaning, but as people kept asking about it, they made something up. They came up with Unicorn Velociraptor, which became the logo of the library.

== See also ==
- libevent
- Reactor pattern
