= Overlapped I/O =

Type of computer input/output processing

Overlapped I/O is a name used for asynchronous I/O in the Windows API. It was introduced as an extension to the API in Windows NT.

Utilizing overlapped I/O requires passing an OVERLAPPED structure to API functions that normally block, including ReadFile(), WriteFile(), and Winsock's WSASend() and WSARecv(). The requested operation is initiated by a function call which returns immediately, and is completed by the OS in the background. The caller may optionally specify a Win32 event handle to be signalled when the operation completes. Alternatively, a program may receive notification of an event via an I/O completion port, which is the preferred method of receiving notification when used in symmetric multiprocessing environments or when handling I/O on numerous files or sockets. The third and the last method to get the I/O completion notification with overlapped IO is to use ReadFileEx() and WriteFileEx(), which allow the User APC routine to be provided, which will be fired on the same thread on completion (User APC is the thing very similar to Unix/POSIX signal, with the main difference being that the signals are using signal numbers from the historically predefined enumeration, while the User APC can be any function declared as "void f(void* context)"). The so-called overlapped API presents some differences depending on the Windows version used.

Asynchronous I/O is particularly useful for sockets and pipes.

Unix and Linux implement the POSIX asynchronous I/O API (AIO).
