= Everything is a file =

Unix philosophy

"Everything is a file" is an approach to interface design in Unix derivatives. While this turn of phrase does not as such figure as a Unix design principle or philosophy, it is a common way to analyse designs, and informs the design of new interfaces in a way that prefers, in rough order of import:

1. representing objects as file descriptors instead of alternatives like abstract handles or names,
2. operating on the objects with standard input/output operations, returning byte streams to be interpreted by applications (rather than explicitly structured data), and
3. allowing the usage or creation of objects by opening or creating files in the global filesystem name space.

The lines between the common interpretations of "file" and "file descriptor" are often blurred when analysing Unix, and nameability of files is the least important part of this principle; thus, it is sometimes described as "Everything is a file descriptor".

This approach is interpreted differently with time, philosophy of each system, and the domain to which it's applied. The rest of this article demonstrates notable examples of some of those interpretations, and their repercussions.

== Objects as file descriptors ==
Under Unix, a directory can be opened like a regular file, containing fixed-size records of (i-node, filename), but directories cannot be written to directly, and are modified by the kernel as a side-effect of creating and removing files within the directory.

Some interfaces only follow a subset of these guidelines, for example pipes do not exist on the filesystem — pipe() creates a pair of unnameable file descriptors. The later invention of named pipes (FIFOs) by POSIX fills this gap.

This does not mean that the only operations on an object are reading and writing: ioctl() and similar interfaces allow for object-specific operations (like controlling tty characteristics), directory file descriptors can be used to alter path look-ups (with a growing number of *at() system call variants like openat()) or to change the working directory to the one represented by the file descriptor, in both cases preventing race conditions and being faster than the alternative of looking up the entire path.

Socket file descriptors require configuration (setting the remote address and connecting) after creation before being used for I/O. A server socket may not be used for I/O directly at all — in connection-based protocols, bind() assigns a local address to a socket, and listen() uses that socket to wait until a remote process connects, then returns a new socket file descriptor representing that direct bidirectional connection.

This approach allows management of objects used by a program in a standardised manner, just like any other file — after binding to an address privileges may be dropped, the server socket may be distributed among many processes by fork()ing (respectively closed in subprocesses that should not have access), or the individual connections' sockets may be given as standard input/output to specialised handlers for those connections, as in the super-server/CGI/inetd paradigms.

Many interfaces present in early Unixes that do not use file descriptors became duplicated in later designs: the alarm()/setitimer() system calls schedule the delivery of a signal after the specified time elapses; this timer is inherited by children, and persists after exec(). The POSIX timer_create() API serves a similar function, but destroys the timer in child processes and on exec(); these timers identified by opaque handles. Both interfaces always deliver their completions asynchronously, and cannot be poll()ed/select()ed, making their integration into a complex event loop more difficult.

The timerfd design (originally found in Linux), turns each timer object into a file descriptor, which can be individually observed with poll() &c. and whose inheritance to child processes can be controlled with the standard close()/CLOEXEC/CLOFORK controls.

While the POSIX API has timer_getoverrun() that returns how many times the timer elapsed, this is returned as the result of read() from a timerfd. This operation blocks, so waiting until a timerfd elapses is as easy as reading from it. There is no way to atomically do this with classic Unix or POSIX timers. The timer can be inspected non-blockingly by performing a non-blocking read (a standard I/O operation).

== Objects in the filesystem namespace ==
=== Special file types ===
Device special files are a defining characteristic of Unix: initially, opening a regular file with i-node number ≤40 (traditionally stored under /dev) instead returned a file descriptor corresponding to a device, and handled by the device driver. The magic i-node number scheme later became codified into files with type S_IFBLK/S_IFCHR.

Opening special files is beholden to the same file-system permissions checks as opening regular files, allowing common access control — chown dmr /usr/dmr /dev/rk0; chmod o= /usr/dmr /dev/rk0 changes the ownership and file access mode of both the directory /usr/dmr and device /dev/rk0.

For block devices (hard disks and tape drives), due to their size, this meant unique semantics: they were block-addressed (see), and programs needed to be written specifically to work correctly with them. This is described as "extremely unfortunate", and later interfaces alleviate this. (Note: First in Version 4 Unix by adding special seek() modes that multiply the offset by 512 in the kernel, finally in Version 7 Unix by providing lseek() with a 32-bit argument.)

In many cases, magnetic tapes continue to have unique semantics: some tapes can be partitioned into "files" and the driver signals an end-of-file condition after the end of a partition is reached, so cp /dev/nrst0 file1; cp /dev/nrst0 file2 will create file1 and file2 consisting of two consecutive partitions of the tape — the driver provides an abstraction layer that presents a tape file descriptor as-if it were a regular file to fit into the Everything is a file paradigm. Specialised programs like mt are used to move between partitions on a tape like this,

Named pipes (FIFOs) appear as S_IFIFO-type files in the filesystem, can be renamed, and may be opened like regular files.

Under Unix derivatives, Unix-domain sockets appear as S_IFSOCK-type files in the filesystem, can be renamed, but cannot be open()ed — one must create the correct type of socket file descriptor and connect() explicitly. Under Plan 9, sockets in the filesystem may be opened like regular files.

==== As a replacement for dedicated system calls ====
Modern systems contain high-performance I/O event notification facilities — kqueue (BSD derivatives), epoll (Linux), IOCP (Windows NT, Solaris), /dev/poll (Solaris) — the control object is generally created (kqueue(), epoll_create()) and configured (kevent(), epoll_ctl()) with dedicated system calls. A /dev/poll instance is created by opening the file "/dev/poll" directly, writing configured objects to observe, and ioctl()s for additional configuration.

Memory may be allocated by requesting an anonymous memory mapping — one that doesn't correspond to any file. On modern systems this can be done by specifying no file and MAP_ANONYMOUS; in UNIX System V Release 4, this was done by opening /dev/zero, and mmap()ping it.

=== API filesystems ===
Operating system APIs can be implemented as regular system calls, or as synthetic file-systems. In the former case, system state can only be inspected by specially-written programs shipped with the system, and any additional processing desired by the user needs to either filter and parse the output of those programs, execute them to write the desired state, or must be implemented in the native system programming language.

In the latter case, system state is presented as-if it were regular files and directories — on systems with a procfs, information about running processes can be obtained by looking at, canonically, /proc, which contains directories named after the PIDs running on the system, containing files like stat (status) with process metadata, cwd, exe, and root — symbolic links to the process' working directory, executable image, and root directory — or directories like fd which contains symbolic links to the files the process has opened, named after the file descriptors.

Because these attributes are presented as files and symbolic links, standard utilities work on them, and one can, say, inspect the identity of the process with grep Uid /proc/1392400/status, go to the same directory as a process is in with cd /proc/1392400/cwd, look what files a process has open with ls -l /proc/1392400/fd, then open a file that process has open with less /proc/1392400/fd/8. This improves ergonomics over parsing this data from the output of a utility.

Under Linux, symbolic links under procfs are "magic": they can actually behave like cross-filesystem hard links to the files they point to. This behaviour allows recovery of files removed from the filesystem but still open by a process, and permanently persisting files created by O_TMPFILE in the filesystem (which otherwise cannot be named).

4.4BSD-derived sysctls are key/value mappings managed by the sysctl program, which lists all variables with sysctl -a, the value of one variable with sysctl net.inet.ip.forwarding, and sets it with sysctl -w net.inet.ip.forwarding=1. Under Linux, the equivalent mechanism is provided by procfs under the /proc/sys tree: the respective operations can be done with find /proc/sys/grep -r ^ /proc/sys, cat /proc/sys/net/ipv4/ip_forward, and echo 1 > /proc/sys/net/ipv4/ip_forward.

For convenience or standards conformance, dedicated inspection tools (like ps and sysctl) may still be provided, using these filesystems as data sources/sinks.

sysfs and debugfs are similar Linux interfaces for further configuring the kernel: writing mem to /sys/power/state will trigger a suspend-to-RAM procedure, and writing 2 to /sys/module/iwlwifi/parameters/led_mode will start blinking the Wi-Fi LED on activity.

These are synthetic file-systems because the contents of each file are not stored anywhere verbatim: when the file is read, the appropriate kernel data structures are serialised into the reading process' input buffer, and when the file is written to, the output buffer is parsed. This means that the file abstraction is broken, since the file metadata isn't valid: depending on the filesystem, each file reports a size of 0 or PAGE_SIZE, even though reading the data will yield a different number of bytes.

== See also ==
- 9P – Network protocol for the Plan 9 distributed operating system
- Unix architecture
- Object-oriented analysis and design
