= Libusb =

Unix software library

libusb
- Initial release: 2007
- Stable release: 1.0.29 / 1 June 2025; 10 months ago
- Written in: C
- Type: Application programming interface; Linux on the desktop
- License: LGPL 2.1
- Website: libusb.info
- Repository: github.com/libusb/libusb.git

The Linux API is composed out of the System Call Interface of the Linux kernel, the GNU C Library, libcgroup, libdrm, libalsa and libevdev (by freedesktop.org).

libusb is a library that provides applications with access for controlling data transfer to and from USB devices on Unix and non-Unix systems, without the need for kernel-mode drivers.

== Availability ==
libusb is currently available for Linux, the BSDs, Solaris, OS X, Windows, Android, and Haiku. It is written in C.

Amongst other applications, the library is used by SANE, the Linux scanner project, in preference to the kernel scanner module, which is restricted to Linux kernel 2.4.

== See also ==
- Linux API
- udev
- Video4Linux
