= Virtual CD-ROM switching utility =

Programs to disable the virtual CD-ROM drive

Virtual CD-ROM switching utilities are programs to disable the virtual CD-ROM drive found on some devices like mobile broadband modems. A virtual CD-ROM switching utility is a mode switching tool for controlling "flip flop" (multiple device) USB gear.

Several USB devices including high-speed wireless WAN equipment offer a feature where they have their device drivers onboard; when plugged in for the first time they act like a USB flash drive and start installing the device drivers. The device will then receive a command from the installed device driver and switch mode, resulting in the virtual CD-ROM drive or USB mass storage device class disappearing and being replaced with the actual device itself. The Wireless WAN (WWAN) gear maker Option calls that feature "ZeroCD (TM)". The device can only be used on OS that support the device driver, as else the driver will never be able to send the command.

With USB sniffing programs and libusb it is possible to eavesdrop the communication of the device driver and isolate the command or action that does the switching and to reproduce the same event under an unsupported environment.

The virtual CD-ROM switching utility can act replicate the command, managing the switch of mode from flash drive to modem, the latter disconnects any mounted disk containing software, and crucially, creates a modem port/serial device (usually /dev/ttyUSB0) for the networkmanager.

Drivers are built into the operating systems as on systems implementing the USB standard like Linux, any 3G device is a USB serial port, and any storage device are really USB storage device, so devices that can't run their own driver may be able to use the built in one instead. Virtual CD-ROM on U3-compatible devices can be removed by a software tool. Some 3G devices such as the Huawei support complete disabling of the Virtual CD-ROM.

Available software utilities include the following:

- ZeroCD: When a device uses the ZeroCD method means that it behaves as a USB CD-ROM when first connected, with a virtual CD-ROM inserted with the Windows device drivers and related Cosmote control program. Once the Windows device drivers are installed, a special USB command is sent to the device to “switch” it to modem mode.
- Ozerocdoff: It temporarily disables ZeroCD for USB Option WWAN modem. The new USB Option WWAN modem devices support a CD-ROM device, which holds the needed Windows device driver to use the WWAN modem. Therefore, the firmware of the WWAN modem announces during the USB enumeration process to work as a virtual CD-ROM device with its vendor name "ZOPTION". This device is now called ZERO-CD. Ozerocdoff is a solution to switch off the ZERO-CD and allow the modem to be a used as a modem.
- USB_ModeSwitch: It is a virtual CD-ROM switching utility. From version 1.0.3 upwards there is a simple framework for integrating the switching with udev (the device manager) to make it fully automatic.
- Switch2modem: It is designed for switching a 3G USB modem. The program works under OpenSolaris.
- Fetch utility: huaweiAktBbo.c is a utility that can be compiled and re-creates the USB communication which is used in Windows.
