= Poll (Unix) =

System call

poll is a POSIX system call to wait for one or more file descriptors to become ready for use.

On the BSD descendants and macOS, it has been largely superseded by kqueue in high performance applications. On Linux, it has been superseded by ppoll and epoll.

== See also ==
- kqueue
- epoll
- inotify
- select
