= Node.js =

JavaScript runtime environment

- Original author: Ryan Dahl
- Developer: OpenJS Foundation
- Release: May 27, 2009; 17 years ago
- Stable release: 26.13.0 / October 28, 2026; 8 days ago
- Written in: JavaScript, C++, Python, C
- Operating system: z/OS, Linux, macOS, Microsoft Windows, SmartOS, FreeBSD, OpenBSD, IBM AIX
- Type: Runtime environment
- License: MIT License
- Website: nodejs.org
- Repository: github.com/nodejs/node

Node.js is a cross-platform, open-source JavaScript runtime environment that can run on Windows, Linux, Unix, macOS, and more. Node.js runs on the V8 JavaScript engine, and executes JavaScript code outside a web browser. According to the Stack Overflow Developer Survey, Node.js is one of the most commonly used web technologies.

Node.js allows developers to use JavaScript for writing command line tools and server-side scripting. Running JavaScript on the server is commonly used to generate dynamic web page content before the page is sent to the user's web browser. Consequently, Node.js represents a "JavaScript everywhere" paradigm, unifying web-application development around a single programming language, as opposed to using different languages for the server- versus client-side programming.

Node.js has an event-driven architecture capable of asynchronous I/O. These design choices aim to optimize throughput and scalability in web applications with many input/output operations, as well as for real-time Web applications (e.g., real-time communication programs and browser games).

The Node.js distributed development project was previously governed by the Node.js Foundation, and has now merged with the JS Foundation to form the OpenJS Foundation. OpenJS Foundation is facilitated by the Linux Foundation's Collaborative Projects program.

== History ==
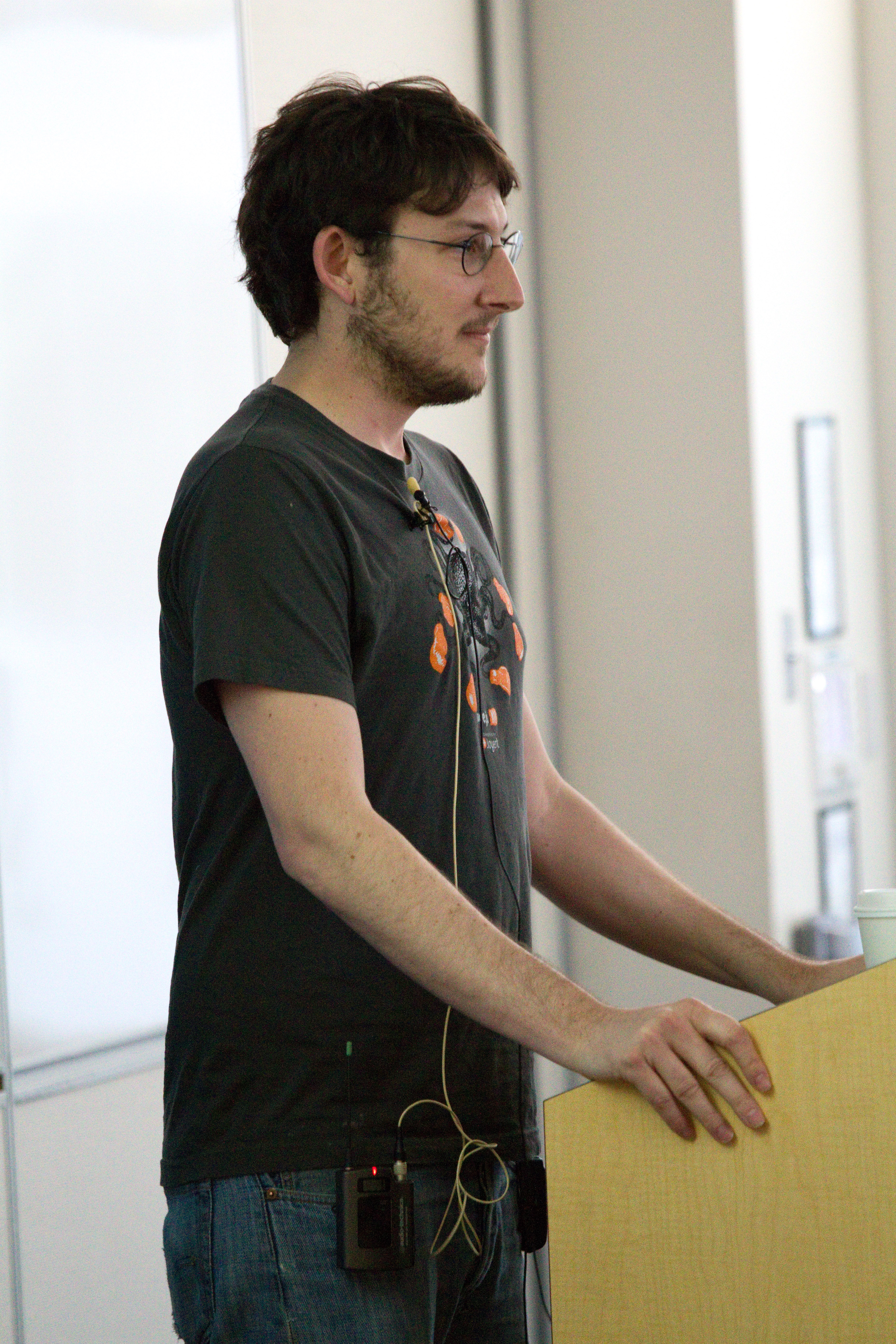
Ryan Dahl, creator of Node.js, in 2010

Rocket Turtle, the official mascot of Node.js since February 2024

Node.js was initially written by Ryan Dahl in 2009, about 13 years after the introduction of the first server-side JavaScript environment, Netscape's LiveWire Pro Web. The initial release supported only Linux and Mac OS X. Its development and maintenance was led by Dahl and later sponsored by Joyent.

Dahl criticized the limited capability of Apache HTTP Server to handle many (10,000+) concurrent connections, as well as the dominant programming paradigm of sequential programming, in which applications could block entire processes or cause the creation of multiple execution stacks for simultaneous connections.

Dahl demonstrated the project at the inaugural European JSConf on November 8, 2009. Node.js combined Google's V8 JavaScript engine, an event loop, and a low-level I/O API.

In January 2010, a package manager was introduced for the Node.js environment called npm (Short for "Node Package Manager"). The package manager allows programmers to publish and share Node.js packages, along with the accompanying source code, and is designed to simplify the installation, update and uninstallation of packages.

In June 2011, Microsoft and Joyent implemented a native Windows version of Node.js. The first Node.js build supporting Windows was released in July 2011.

In January 2012, Dahl yielded management of the project to npm creator Isaac Schlueter. In January 2014, Schlueter announced that Timothy J. Fontaine would lead the project.

In December 2014, Fedor Indutny created io.js, a fork of Node.js created because of dissatisfaction with Joyent's governance as an open-governance alternative with a separate technical committee. The goal was to enable a structure that would be more receptive to community input, including the updating of io.js with the latest Google V8 JavaScript engine releases, diverging from Node.js's approach at that time.

The Node.js Foundation, formed to reconcile Node.js and io.js under a unified banner, was announced in February 2015. The merger was realized in September 2015 with Node.js v0.12 and io.js v3.3 combining into Node v4.0. This merge brought V8 ES6 features into Node.js and started a long-term support release cycle. By 2016, the io.js website recommended returning to Node.js and announced no further io.js releases, effectively ending the fork and solidifying the merger's success.

In 2019, the JS Foundation and Node.js Foundation merged to form the OpenJS Foundation.

=== Branding ===
The Node.js logo features a green hexagon with overlapping bands to represent the cross-platform nature of the runtime. The Rocket Turtle was chosen as the official Node.js mascot in February 2024 following a design contest.

== Overview ==
Node.js allows the creation of web servers and networking tools using JavaScript and a collection of "modules" that handle various core functionalities. Modules are provided for file system I/O, networking (DNS, HTTP, TCP, TLS/SSL or UDP), binary data (buffers), cryptography functions, data streams and other core functions. Node.js's modules use an API designed to reduce the complexity of writing server applications.

Since version 22.6.0, Node.js natively supports both JavaScript and TypeScript, allowing TypeScript files to be executed without a separate compilation step. The TypeScript support was contributed by Node.js TSC member Marco Ippolito. In addition, many compile-to-JS languages are available, allowing Node.js applications to also be written in CoffeeScript, Dart, ClojureScript, and others.

Node.js is primarily used to build network programs such as web servers. The most significant difference between Node.js and PHP is that most functions in PHP block until completion (commands execute only after previous commands finish), while Node.js functions are non-blocking (commands execute concurrently and use callbacks to signal completion or failure).

Node.js is officially supported by Linux, macOS and Microsoft Windows 8.1 and Server 2012 (and later), with Tier 2 support for SmartOS and IBM AIX and experimental support for FreeBSD. OpenBSD also works, and LTS versions are available for IBM i (AS/400). The source code may also be built on similar operating systems that are not officially supported, such as NonStop OS and Unix servers.

=== Platform architecture ===
Node.js enables development of fast web servers in JavaScript using event-driven programming. Developers can create scalable servers without using threading by using a simplified model that uses callbacks to signal the completion of a task. Node.js connects the ease of a scripting language (JavaScript) with the power of Unix network programming.

Node.js was built on top of Google's V8 JavaScript engine, which Google had open-sourced under a BSD 3-Clause license in September 2008 alongside the initial release of Google Chrome. Dahl selected V8 for its high performance and its just-in-time compilation of JavaScript to native machine code, and paired it with a libuv-based event loop and comprehensive support for fundamental protocols such as HTTP, DNS, and TCP. JavaScript's existing popularity made Node.js accessible to the web-development community.

=== Industry support ===
There are thousands of open-source libraries for Node.js, most of which are hosted on the npm website. Multiple developer conferences and events are held that support the Node.js community, including NodeConf, Node Interactive, and Node Summit, as well as a number of regional events.

The open-source community has developed web frameworks to accelerate the development of applications. Such frameworks include Express.js, Socket.IO, Sails.js, Next.js and Meteor. Various packages have also been created for interfacing with other languages or runtime environments such as Microsoft .NET.

Modern desktop IDEs provide editing and debugging features specifically for Node.js applications. Such IDEs include Atom, Brackets, JetBrains WebStorm, Microsoft Visual Studio (with Node.js Tools for Visual Studio, or TypeScript with Node definitions), NetBeans, Nodeclipse Enide Studio (Eclipse-based) and Visual Studio Code. Some online IDEs also support Node.js, such as Codeanywhere, Eclipse Che, Cloud9 IDE and the visual flow editor in Node-RED.

Node.js is supported across a number of cloud-hosting platforms such as Jelastic, Google Cloud Platform, AWS Elastic Beanstalk, Azure Web Apps and Joyent.

== Releases ==
Major Node.js versions currently enter Current release status for six months. Historically, up to Node.js 26, odd-numbered releases became unsupported after six months, while even-numbered releases moved to Active LTS. Starting with Node.js 27, Node.js is moving to an annual major-release cycle, and every major version is planned to move to LTS after its Current phase and an additional Alpha phase. LTS releases are generally supported for about 30 months, including Active LTS and Maintenance LTS periods. Production applications are recommended to use Active LTS or Maintenance LTS releases.

Release	Status	Code name	Release date	Maintenance end
0.10.x	End-of-Life		2013-03-11	2016-10-31
0.12.x	End-of-Life		2015-02-06	2016-12-31
4.x	End-of-Life	Argon	2015-09-08	2018-04-30
5.x	End-of-Life		2015-10-29	2016-06-30
6.x	End-of-Life	Boron	2016-04-26	2019-04-30
7.x	End-of-Life		2016-10-25	2017-06-30
8.x	End-of-Life	Carbon	2017-05-30	2019-12-31
9.x	End-of-Life		2017-10-01	2018-06-30
10.x	End-of-Life	Dubnium	2018-04-24	2021-04-30
11.x	End-of-Life		2018-10-23	2019-06-01
12.x	End-of-Life	Erbium	2019-04-23	2022-04-30
13.x	End-of-Life		2019-10-22	2020-06-01
14.x	End-of-Life	Fermium	2020-04-21	2023-04-30
15.x	End-of-Life		2020-10-20	2021-06-01
16.x	End-of-Life	Gallium	2021-04-20	2023-09-11
17.x	End-of-Life		2021-10-19	2022-06-01
18.x	End-of-Life	Hydrogen	2022-04-19	2025-04-30
19.x	End-of-Life		2022-10-18	2023-06-01
20.x	End-of-Life	Iron	2023-04-18	2026-04-30
21.x	End-of-Life		2023-10-17	2024-06-01
22.x	Maintenance LTS	Jod	2024-04-24	2027-04-30
23.x	End-of-Life		2024-10-15	2025-06-01
24.x	Maintenance LTS	Krypton	2025-04-22	2028-04-30
25.x	End-of-Life		2025-10-15	2026-06-01
26.x	Active LTS	Lithium	2026-05-05	2029-04-30
27.x	Alpha	Magnesium	2026-10-28	2030-04-30
28.x	Planned	Neon	2028	2031
29.x	Planned	Oxygen	2029	2032
30.x	Planned	Platinum	2030	2033
Legend: Unsupported Supported Latest version Preview version Future version

== Technical details ==
Node.js is a JavaScript runtime environment that processes incoming requests in a loop, called the event loop.

=== Internals ===
Node.js uses libuv under the hood to handle asynchronous events. Libuv is an abstraction layer for network and file system functionality on both Windows and POSIX-based systems such as Linux, macOS, OSS on NonStop, and Unix. Node.js relies on nghttp2 for HTTP support. As of version 20, Node.js uses the ada library which provides up-to-date WHATWG URL compliance. As of version 19.5, Node.js uses the simdutf library for fast Unicode validation and transcoding. As of version 21.3, Node.js uses the simdjson library for fast JSON parsing.

=== Threading ===
Node.js operates on a single-thread event loop, using non-blocking I/O calls, allowing it to support tens of thousands of concurrent connections without incurring the cost of thread context switching. The design of sharing a single thread among all the requests that use the observer pattern is intended for building highly concurrent applications, where any function performing I/O must use a callback. To accommodate the single-threaded event loop, Node.js uses the libuv library—which, in turn, uses a fixed-sized thread pool that handles some of the non-blocking asynchronous I/O operations.

A thread pool handles the execution of parallel tasks in Node.js. The main thread function call posts tasks to the shared task queue, which threads in the thread pool pull and execute. Inherently non-blocking system functions such as networking translate to kernel-side non-blocking sockets, while inherently blocking system functions such as file I/O run in a blocking way on their own threads. When a thread in the thread pool completes a task, it informs the main thread of this, which in turn, wakes up and executes the registered callback.

A downside of this single-threaded approach is that Node.js does not allow vertical scaling by increasing the number of CPU cores of the machine it is running on without using an additional module, such as cluster, StrongLoop Process Manager, or pm2. However, developers can increase the default number of threads in the libuv thread pool. The server operating system (OS) is likely to distribute these threads across multiple cores. Another problem is that long-lasting computations and other CPU-bound tasks freeze the entire event-loop until completion.

=== V8 ===
V8 is the JavaScript execution engine which was initially built for Google Chrome, later made open-source by Google in 2008. Written in C++, V8 compiles JavaScript source code to native machine code at runtime. As of 2016, it also includes Ignition, a bytecode interpreter.

=== Package management ===
npm is the pre-installed package manager for the Node.js server platform. It installs Node.js programs from the npm registry, organizing the installation and management of third-party Node.js programs.

=== Event loop ===
Node.js registers with the operating system so the OS notifies it of asynchronous I/O events such as new connections. Within the Node.js runtime, events trigger callbacks and each connection is handled as a small heap allocation. Traditionally, relatively heavyweight OS processes or threads handled each connection. Node.js uses an event loop for concurrent I/O, instead of processes or threads. In contrast to other event-driven servers, Node.js's event loop does not need to be called explicitly. Instead, callbacks are defined, and the server automatically enters the event loop at the end of the callback definition. Node.js exits the event loop when there are no further callbacks to be performed.

=== WebAssembly ===
Node.js supports WebAssembly and as of Node 14 has experimental support of WASI, the WebAssembly System Interface.

=== Native bindings ===
Node.js provides a way to create "add-ons" via a C-based API called N-API, which can be used to produce loadable (importable) .node modules from source code written in C/C++. The modules can be directly loaded into memory and executed from within JS environment as simple CommonJS modules. The implementation of the N-API relies on internal C/C++ Node.js and V8 objects requiring users to import (#include) Node.js specific headers into their native source code.

As the Node.js API is subject to breaking changes at a binary level, modules have to be built and shipped against specific Node.js versions to work properly. To address the issue, third parties have introduced open-sourced С/С++ wrappers on top of the API that partially alleviate the problem. They simplify interfaces, but as a side effect they may also introduce complexity which maintainers have to deal with. Even though the core functionality of Node.js resides in a JavaScript built-in library, modules written in C++ can be used to enhance capabilities and to improve performance of applications.

In order to produce such modules one needs to have an appropriate C++ compiler and necessary headers (the latter are typically shipped with Node.js itself), e.g., gcc, clang or MSVC++.

The N-API is similar to Java Native Interface. OpenHarmony and ArkTS also adopts N-API, with the internal implementation rewritten.

== Project governance ==
In 2015, various branches of the greater Node.js community began working under the vendor-neutral Node.js Foundation. The stated purpose of the organization "is to enable widespread adoption and help accelerate development of Node.js and other related modules through an open governance model that encourages participation, technical contribution, and a framework for long-term stewardship by an ecosystem invested in Node.js' success."

The Node.js Foundation Technical Steering Committee (TSC) is the technical governing body of the Node.js Foundation. The TSC is responsible for the core Node.js repo as well as dependent and adjacent projects. Generally the TSC delegates the administration of these projects to working groups or committees. The LTS group that manages long term supported releases is one such group. Other current groups include Website, Streams, Build, Diagnostics, i18n, Evangelism, Docker, Addon API, Benchmarking, Post-mortem, Intl, Documentation, and Testing.

In August 2017, a third of the TSC members resigned due to a dispute related to the project's code of conduct. They resigned after a vote failed to remove a member from the leadership group against whom multiple complaints had been filed.

Current TSC Members
Username	Full Name
aduh95	Antoine du Hamel
anonrig	Yagiz Nizipli
benjamingr	Benjamin Gruenbaum
BridgeAR	Ruben Bridgewater
gireeshpunathil	Gireesh Punathil
jasnell	James M Snell
joyeecheung	Joyee Cheung
legendecas	Chengzhong Wu
marco-ippolito	Marco Ippolito
mcollina	Matteo Collina
mhdawson	Michael Dawson
RafaelGSS	Rafael Gonzaga
richardlau	Richard Lau
ronag	Robert Nagy
ruyadorno	Ruy Adorno
ShogunPanda	Paolo Insogna
targos	Michaël Zasso
tniessen	Tobias Nießen
