= The Linux Programming Interface =

Book by Michael Kerrisk

- Author: Michael Kerrisk
- Language: English
- Series: Learning
- Subject: covers current UNIX® standards (POSIX.1-2001 /SUSv3 and POSIX.1-2008 /SUSv4 )
- Published: 2010 (No Starch Press)
- Pages: 1512
- ISBN: 978-1-59327-220-3

The Linux Programming Interface: A Linux and UNIX System Programming Handbook is a book written by Michael Kerrisk, which documents the APIs of the Linux kernel and the GNU C Library (glibc).

== Book ==
The book covers topics related to the Linux operating system and operating systems in general. It chronicles the history of Unix and how it led to the creation of Linux. The book provides samples of code written in C, and learning exercises at the end of chapters. The author is a former writer for the Linux Weekly News and a maintainer for the Linux man pages project since 2004.

The Linux Programming Interface has been translated into Chinese, Japanese, Russian, and Korean.

== See also ==
- Linux kernel interfaces
