= Unix architecture =

Computer operating system architecture

A Unix architecture is a computer operating system system architecture that embodies the Unix philosophy. It may adhere to standards such as the Single UNIX Specification (SUS) or similar POSIX IEEE standard. No single published standard describes all Unix architecture computer operating systems – this is in part a legacy of the Unix wars.

== Description ==
There are many systems which are Unix-like in their architecture. Notable among these are the Linux distributions. The distinctions between Unix and Unix-like systems have been the subject of heated legal battles, and the holders of the UNIX brand, The Open Group, object to "Unix-like" and similar terms.

For distinctions between SUS branded UNIX architectures and other similar architectures, see Unix-like.

== Kernel ==
A Unix kernel – the core or key components of the operating system – consists of many kernel subsystems like process management, scheduling, file management, device management, network management, memory management, and dealing with interrupts from hardware devices.

Each of the subsystems has some features:

- Concurrency: As Unix is a multiprocessing OS, many processes run concurrently to improve the performance of the system.
- Virtual memory (VM): Memory management subsystem implements the virtual memory concept and users need not worry about the executable program size and the RAM size.
- Paging: It is a technique to minimize the internal as well as the external fragmentation in the physical memory.
- Virtual file system (VFS): A VFS is a file system used to help the user to hide the different file systems complexities. A user can use the same standard file system related calls to access different file systems.

The kernel provides these and other basic services: interrupt and trap handling, separation between user and system space, system calls, scheduling, timer and clock handling, file descriptor management.

== Features ==
Some key features of Unix systems are:

- Unix systems use a centralized operating system kernel which manages system and process activities.
- All non-kernel software is organized into separate, kernel-managed processes.
- Unix systems are preemptively multitasking: multiple processes can run at the same time, or within small time slices and nearly at the same time, and any process can be interrupted and moved out of execution by the kernel. This is known as thread management.
- Unix systems support multiple user accounts and having multiple users logged on to the system.
- Files are stored on disk in a hierarchical file system, with a single top location throughout the system (root, or "/"), with both files and directories, subdirectories, sub-subdirectories, and so on below it.
- With few exceptions, devices and some types of communications between processes are managed and visible as files or pseudo-files within the file system hierarchy. Some sources of system information may also be visible as pseudo-files. This is known as everything is a file. However, Linus Torvalds states that this is inaccurate and may be better rephrased as "everything is a stream of bytes".

The UNIX operating system supports the following features and capabilities:

- Built-in networking (TCP/IP is standard)
- Persistent system service processes called "daemons" and managed by init or inet

== Criticism ==
The UNIX-HATERS Handbook covers some of these design features as failures from the user point of view. However, although some information is quite dated and cannot be applied to modern Unixes or Unix-like operating systems such as Linux, Eric S. Raymond discovered that several issues are still prevailing, while others were resolved. Raymond concludes that not all concepts behind Unix can be deemed as non-functional even though the book's intention may have been to portray Unix as inferior without encouraging discussions with developers to actually fix the issues.

== See also ==
- Architecture of Windows NT
