= C-SKY =

C-SKY is a RISC-based 32-bit architecture developed by C-SKY Microsystems, a subsidiary of Alibaba Group's T-Head semiconductor division. The instruction set was derived by the M·CORE.

== History ==
C-SKY Microsystems was founded in Hangzhou, China, in 2001. The architecture was developed to provide a domestic Chinese alternative to ARM and MIPS for embedded applications.

In April 2018, Alibaba Group acquired C-SKY Microsystems to bolster its chip-making capabilities. Following the acquisition, the company was integrated into Alibaba's "T-Head" (Pingtouge) semiconductor arm.

While T-Head has since pivoted heavily toward RISC-V (with the XuanTie series), C-SKY remains a supported legacy architecture with millions of units in the field.

== Architecture ==
The C-SKY ISA is designed for high code density and low power consumption. It features two primary versions:

- V1: The legacy version, focused on basic embedded control.
- V2: The modern version, which introduced a 16/32-bit mixed-length instruction set (similar to ARM’s Thumb-2). This version supports hardware floating-point units (FPU), DSP extensions, and multi-core configurations.

Common CPU Cores:

- CK801 / CK802: Ultra-low power, 2-stage pipeline.
- CK803: Low power with optional FPU and DSP extensions.
- CK810: High-performance application processor with a 10-stage pipeline and MMU support for Linux.
- CK860: High-end multi-core variant with SMP support.

== Software Support ==
- Linux Kernel: Support was officially merged in Kernel 4.20 (late 2018).
- GCC: Official support was added in GCC 9 (2019), allowing for cross-compilation of C/C++ applications.
- Glibc: The GNU C Library added C-SKY support in version 2.29.
- Operating Systems: In addition to Linux, it is supported by various RTOS like AliOS Things and Zephyr.

== See also ==
- Alibaba Group
- RISC-V
- Loongson (Another Chinese ISA)
