= Sigaction =

In computing, sigaction is a function API defined by POSIX to give the programmer access to what a program's behavior should be when receiving specific OS signals.

== General ==
In Unix-like operating systems, one means of inter-process communication is through signals. When an executing unit (process or thread) receives a signal from the OS, it should react in some way defined by the datasheet and the conventional meaning of this signal (i.e. by dumping its data, stopping execution, synchronizing something...).

The sigaction() system call is used to declare the behavior of the program should it receive one particular non-system-reserved signal. This is done by giving along with the system call a structure containing, among others, a function pointer to the signal handling routine. Some predefined signals (such as SIGKILL) have locked behavior that is handled by the system and cannot be overridden by such system calls.

== sigaction structure ==
The POSIX standard requires that the sigaction structure be defined as below in the <signal.h> header file and it should contain at least the following fields:

struct sigaction {
	void (*sa_handler)(int); // address of signal handler
	sigset_t sa_mask; // additional signals to block
	int sa_flags; // signal options
	
	// alternate signal handler
	void (*sa_sigaction)(int, siginfo_t*, void*);
};

Implementations are free to define additional, possibly non-portable fields. The sa_handler member specifies the address of a function to be called when the process receives the signal. The signal number is passed as an integer argument to this function. The sa_mask member specifies additional signals to be blocked during the execution of signal handler. sa_mask must be initialized with sigemptyset(3). The sa_flags member specifies some additional flags. sa_sigaction is an alternate signal handler with different set of parameters. Only one signal handler must be specified, either sa_handler or sa_sigaction. If it is desired to use sa_sigaction instead of sa_handler, SA_SIGINFO flag must be set.

== Replacement for signal() ==
The sigaction() function provides an interface for reliable signals in replacement of the unreliable signal() function. Signal handlers installed by the signal() interface will be uninstalled immediately prior to execution of the handler. Permanent handlers must therefore be reinstalled by a call to signal() during the handler's execution, causing unreliability in the event a signal of the same type is received during the handler's execution but before the reinstall. Handlers installed by the sigaction() interface can be installed permanently and a custom set of signals can be blocked during the execution of the handler. These signals will be unblocked immediately following the normal termination of the handler (but not in the event of an abnormal termination such as a C++ exception throw.)

== Use in C++ ==
In C++, the try/catch programming structure may be (depending on host platforms) based on signalling. To catch signals translated into C++ exceptions, special compiler switches may be necessary on some platforms such as -fnon-call-exceptions for GCC and the Intel C Compiler.

== Example ==
#include <signal.h>
#include <stdio.h>
#include <stdlib.h>
#include <string.h>

#include <unistd.h>
#include <sys/wait.h>

#define NUM_CHILDREN 10

// Global variable counting number of exited child processes
sig_atomic_t exited_children_count = 0;

void sigchld_handler(int signo, siginfo_t *sinfo, void *context) {
    pid_t proc;

    while ((proc = waitpid(-1, NULL, WNOHANG)) > 0) {
        // signal main thread
        ++exited_children_count;

        // note: printf() is not signal-safe!
        // don't use it in a signal handler.
        // si_code is the full 32 bit exit code from the child (see also waitid()).
		printf("sinfo->si_pid = %ld\nproc = %ld\nexit code %d exit reason %d\n",
            (long)sinfo->si_pid, (long)proc, sinfo->si_status, sinfo->si_code);
    }
}

int main() {
    struct sigaction act = {
        .sa_sigaction = sigchld_handler,
        .sa_flags = SA_SIGINFO
    };
    sigemptyset(&act.sa_mask);

    if (sigaction(SIGCHLD, &act, NULL) == -1) {
        perror("sigaction()");
        return EXIT_FAILURE;
    }

    for (int i = 0; i < NUM_CHILDREN; ++i) {
        switch (fork()) {
            case 0:
                // Older OS implementations that do not correctly implement
                // the siginfo structure will truncate the exit code
                // by masking it with 0xFF.
                write(STDERR_FILENO, "fork() returned 0");
                return EXIT_FAILURE;
            case -1:
                write(STDERR_FILENO, "fork() error!", 11);
                return EXIT_FAILURE;
            default:
                printf("Child created.\n");
        }
    }


    while (true) {
        if (nexitedchlds < NUM_CHILDREN) {
            pause();
        } else {
            return EXIT_SUCCESS;
        }
    }
    return 0;
}
