= Michael Kerrisk =

Technical author and programmer

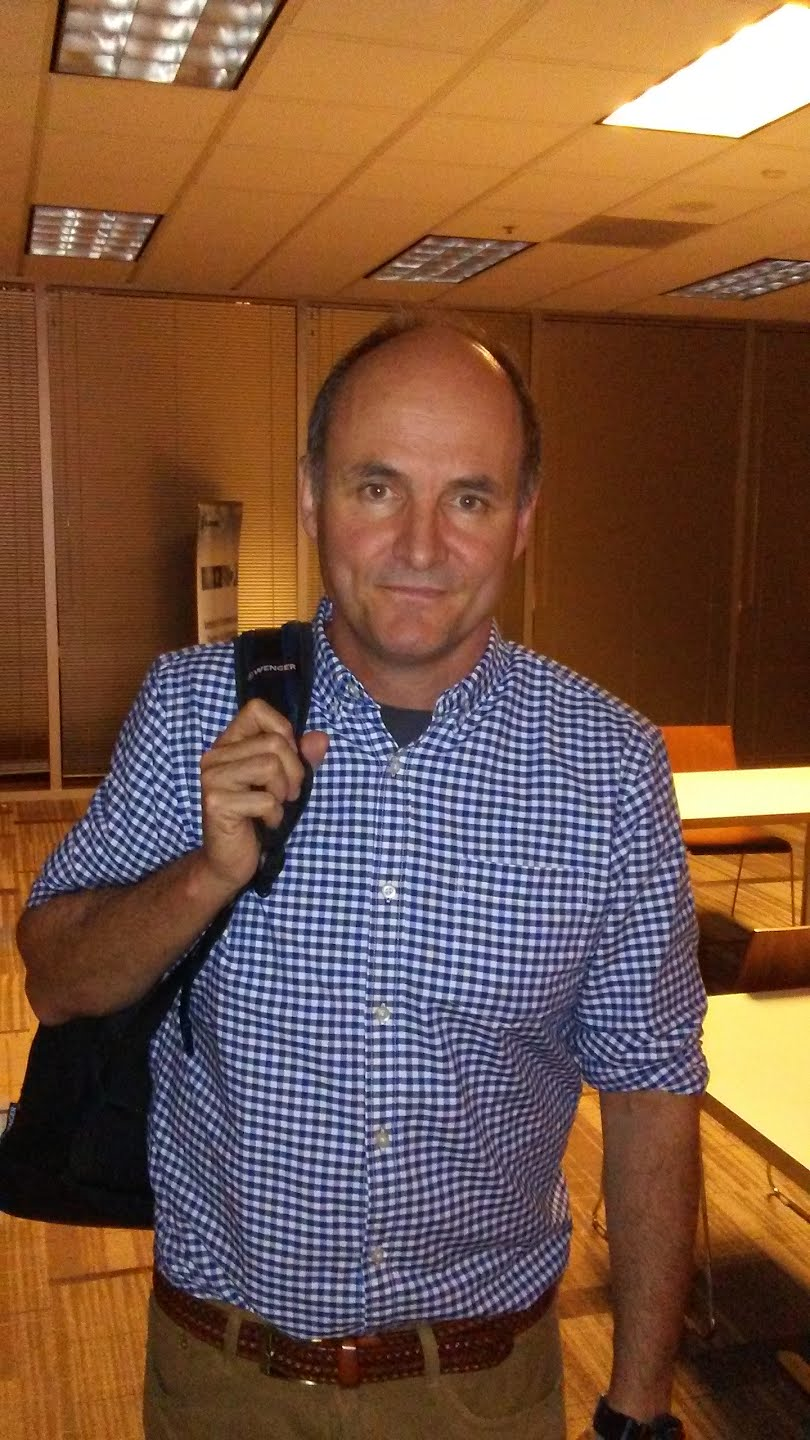
- Born: 1961 (age 64–65); New Zealand
- Education: BSc (hons) Computer Science, BA Psychology, University of Canterbury
- Occupations: Author and Programmer
- Known for: The Linux Programming Interface, Linux man-pages project
- Website: man7.org

Michael Kerrisk is a technical author, programmer and, since 2004, maintainer of the Linux man-pages project, succeeding Andries Brouwer. He was born in 1961 in New Zealand and lives in Munich, Germany.

Kerrisk has worked for Digital Equipment, Google, the Linux Foundation and, as an editor and writer, for LWN.net. Currently, he works as a freelance consultant and trainer.

He is known for his book The Linux Programming Interface, published by No Starch Press in 2010. This book is widely regarded as the definitive work on Linux system programming and has been translated into several languages.

As the maintainer of the Linux man-pages project, Kerrisk has authored or co-authored about a third of the man pages and worked on improving the project's infrastructure. For his contributions he received a Special Award of the 2016 New Zealand Open Source Awards.
