= Window class =

In computer programming, a window class is a fundamental in many windowing systems, including the Microsoft Windows (Win16, Win32, and Win64) operating systems, IBM OS/2 and the X Window System. The class defines the window procedure used to process messages for all windows created with that class.

The structure provides a template from which windows may be created by specifying a window's icons, menu, background color and a few other features. It also holds a pointer to a procedure that controls how the window behaves in response to user interaction. It finally tells the operating system how much additional storage space is needed for the class and each window created from it.
