= Inotify =

Linux subsystem for filesystem monitoring

inotify (inode notify) is a Linux kernel subsystem created by John McCutchan, which monitors changes to the filesystem, and reports those changes to applications. It can be used to automatically update directory views, reload configuration files, log changes, backup, synchronize, and upload. The inotifywait and inotifywatch commands (maintained by Eric Curtin as part of the inotify-tools project) allow using the inotify subsystem from the command line. One major use is in desktop search utilities like Beagle, where its functionality permits reindexing of changed files without scanning the filesystem for changes every few minutes, which would be very inefficient.

inotify replaced an earlier facility, dnotify, which had similar goals. Inotify was merged into the Linux kernel mainline in kernel version 2.6.13, released on August 29, 2005; later kernel versions included further improvements. The required library interfaces were added into the GNU C Library (glibc) in its version 2.4, released in March 2006, while the support for inotify was completed in glibc version 2.5, released in September 2006.

== Limitations ==
Limitations imposed by inotify include the following:

- Inotify does not support recursively watching directories, meaning that a separate inotify watch must be created for every subdirectory. In contrast, the command inotifywait does provide recursive watching of directories.
- Inotify does report some but not all events in sysfs and procfs.
- Notification via inotify requires the kernel to be aware of all relevant filesystem events, which is not always possible for networked filesystems such as NFS where changes made by one client are not immediately broadcast to other clients.
- Rename events are not handled directly; i.e., inotify issues two separate events that must be examined and matched in a context of potential race conditions.

== History ==
- July 2004: the first release announcement
- August 29, 2005: Linux kernel version 2.6.13 released, containing merged inotify code
- March 2006: GNU C Library (glibc) version 2.4 released, bringing initial inotify support
- September 2006: Glibc version 2.5 released, bringing complete inotify support

== Advantages over dnotify ==
There are a number of advantages when using inotify when compared to the older dnotify API that it replaced. With dnotify, a program had to use one file descriptor for each directory that it was monitoring. This can become a bottleneck since the limit of file descriptors per process could be reached. Later, fanotify was created to overcome this issue. The use of file descriptors along with dnotify also proved to be a problem when using removable media. Devices could not be unmounted since file descriptors kept the resource busy.

Another drawback of dnotify is the level of granularity, since programmers can only monitor changes at the directory level. To access detailed information about the environmental changes that occur when a notification message is sent, a stat structure must be used; this is considered a necessary evil in that a cache of stat structures has to be maintained, for every new stat structure generated a comparison is run against the cached one.

The inotify API uses fewer file descriptors, allowing programmers to use the established select and poll interface, rather than the signal notification system used by dnotify. This also makes integration with existing select- or poll-based libraries (like GLib) easier.

== See also ==
- File Alteration Monitor (SGI)
- DMAPI
- kqueue (FreeBSD, NetBSD, OpenBSD, DragonFly BSD, and macOS)
- FSEvents (macOS)
