= Input/output completion port =

Connection for Window PC computers

Input/output completion port (IOCP) is an API for performing multiple simultaneous asynchronous input/output operations in Windows NT versions 3.5 and later, AIX and on Solaris 10 and later. An input/output completion port object is created and associated with a number of sockets or file handles. When I/O services are requested on the object, completion is indicated by a message queued to the I/O completion port. A process requesting I/O services is not notified of completion of the I/O services, but instead checks the I/O completion port's message queue to determine the status of its I/O requests. The I/O completion port manages multiple threads and their concurrency.

Since Windows 11, version 21H2, Microsoft Windows supports I/O Ring.

== See also ==
- Overlapped I/O
- kqueue
- epoll
- io_uring
