= Epoll =

Linux system call for I/O event notification mechanism

epoll is a Linux kernel system call for a scalable I/O event notification mechanism, first introduced in version 2.5.45 of the Linux kernel in October, 2002. Its function is to monitor multiple file descriptors to see whether I/O is possible on any of them. It is meant to replace the older POSIX select(2) and poll(2) system calls, to achieve better performance in more demanding applications, where the number of watched file descriptors is large (unlike the older system calls, which operate in O(n) time, epoll operates in O(1) time).

epoll is similar to FreeBSD's kqueue, in that it consists of a set of user-space functions, each taking a file descriptor argument denoting the configurable kernel object, against which they cooperatively operate. epoll uses a red–black tree (RB-tree) data structure to keep track of all file descriptors that are currently being monitored.

== API ==
int epoll_create1(int flags);

Creates an epoll object and returns its file descriptor. The flags parameter allows epoll behavior to be modified. It has only one valid value, EPOLL_CLOEXEC. epoll_create() is an older variant of epoll_create1() and is deprecated as of Linux kernel version 2.6.27 and glibc version 2.9.

int epoll_ctl(int epfd, int op, int fd, struct epoll_event* event);

Controls (configures) which file descriptors are watched by this object, and for which events. op can be ADD, MODIFY or DELETE.

int epoll_wait(int epfd, struct epoll_event* events, int maxevents, int timeout);

Waits for any of the events registered for with epoll_ctl, until at least one occurs or the timeout elapses. Returns the occurred events in events, up to maxevents at once. maxevents is the maximum number of epoll_event/file descriptors to be monitored. In most case, maxevents is set to the value of the size of *events argument (struct epoll_event* events array).

== Triggering modes ==
epoll provides both edge-triggered and level-triggered modes. In edge-triggered mode, a call to epoll_wait will return only when a new event is enqueued with the epoll object, while in level-triggered mode, epoll_wait will return as long as the condition holds.

For instance, if a pipe registered with epoll has received data, a call to epoll_wait will return, signaling the presence of data to be read. Suppose, the reader only consumed part of data from the buffer. In level-triggered mode, further calls to epoll_wait will return immediately, as long as the pipe's buffer contains data to be read. In edge-triggered mode, however, epoll_wait will return only once new data is written to the pipe.

== Bugs ==
Bryan Cantrill pointed out that epoll had mistakes that could have been avoided, had it learned from its predecessors: input/output completion ports, event ports (Solaris) and kqueue. However, a large part of his criticism was addressed by epoll's EPOLLONESHOT and EPOLLEXCLUSIVE options. EPOLLONESHOT was added in version 2.6.2 of the Linux kernel mainline, released in February 2004. EPOLLEXCLUSIVE was added in version 4.5, released in March 2016.

== See also ==
- Input/output completion port (IOCP)
- kqueue
- libevent
