= Mobile marketing =

Multi-channel online marketing technique

Mobile marketing is a multi-channel online marketing technique focused at reaching a specific audience on their smartphones, feature phones, tablets, or any other related devices through websites, e-mail, SMS and MMS, social media, or mobile applications. Mobile marketing can provide customers with time and location sensitive, personalized information that promotes goods, services, appointment reminders and ideas. In a more theoretical manner, academic Andreas Kaplan defines mobile marketing as "any marketing activity conducted through a ubiquitous network to which consumers are constantly connected using a personal mobile device".

== SMS marketing ==
Marketing through cellphones SMS (Short Message Service) became increasingly popular in the early 2000s in Europe and some parts of Asia when businesses started to collect mobile phone numbers and send wanted (or unwanted) content. On average, SMS messages have a 98% open rate and are read within 3 minutes, making them highly effective at reaching recipients quickly.

Over the past few years, SMS marketing has become a legitimate advertising channel in some parts of the world. This is because, unlike email over the public internet, the carriers who police their own networks have set guidelines and best practices for the mobile media industry (including mobile advertising). The IAB (Interactive Advertising Bureau) has established guidelines and is evangelizing the use of the mobile channel for marketers. While this has been fruitful in developed regions such as North America, Western Europe and some other countries, mobile SPAM messages (SMS sent to mobile subscribers without a legitimate and explicit opt-in by the subscriber) remain an issue in many other parts of the world, partly due to the carriers selling their member databases to third parties. In India, however, the government's efforts to create the National Do Not Call Registry have helped cellphone users stop SMS advertisements by sending a simple SMS or calling 1909.

Mobile marketing approaches through SMS have expanded rapidly in Europe and Asia as a new channel to reach the consumer. SMS initially received negative media coverage in many parts of Europe for being a new form of spam as some advertisers purchased lists and sent unsolicited content to consumer's phones; however, as guidelines are put in place by the mobile operators, SMS has become the most popular branch of the Mobile Marketing industry with several 100 million advertising SMS sent out every month in Europe alone. This is thanks in part to SMS messages being hardware-agnostic—they can be delivered to practically any mobile phone, smartphone or feature phone and accessed without a Wi-Fi or mobile data connection. This is important to note since there were over 5 billion unique mobile phone subscribers worldwide in 2017, which is about 66% of the world population.

In the present day, the mobile phone has become focal and essential. Mobile technologies facilitate business opportunities connecting businesspeople and consumers at all times and places. Due to this, digital marketing has received more focus, and mobile marketing is one of the newest digital marketing channels under consideration. Digital marketing permits communication of information regarding the features of goods consumers like without the need for consumers to go to an actual store.

SMS marketing has both inbound and outbound marketing strategies. Inbound marketing focuses on lead generation, and outbound marketing focuses on sending messages for sales, promotions, contests, donations, television program voting, appointments and event reminders.

There are five key components to SMS marketing: sender ID, message size, content structure, spam compliance, and message delivery. SMS marketing campaigns are commonly used to communicate promotional offers, customer updates, and appointment reminders.

=== Sender ID ===
A sender ID is a name or number that identifies who the sender is. For commercial purposes, virtual numbers, short codes, SIM hosting, and custom names are most commonly used and can be leased through bulk SMS providers.

==== Shared virtual numbers ====
As the name implies, shared virtual numbers are shared by many different senders. They're usually free, but they can't receive SMS replies, and the number changes from time to time without notice or consent. Senders may have different shared virtual numbers on different days, which may make it confusing or untrustworthy for recipients depending on the context. For example, shared virtual numbers may be suitable for 2-factor authentication text messages, as recipients are often expecting these text messages, which are often triggered by actions that the recipients make. But for text messages that the recipient isn't expecting, like a sales promotion, a dedicated virtual number may be preferred.

==== Dedicated virtual numbers ====
To avoid sharing numbers with other senders, and for brand recognition and number consistency, leasing a dedicated virtual number, which are also known as a long code or long number (international number format, e.g. +44 7624 805000 or US number format, e.g. 757-772-8555), is a viable option. Unlike a shared number, it can receive SMS replies. Senders can choose from a list of available dedicated virtual numbers from a bulk SMS provider. Prices for dedicated virtual numbers can vary. Some numbers, often called Gold numbers, are easier to recognise and, therefore, more expensive to lease. Senders may also get creative and choose a vanity number. These numbers spell out a word or phrase using the keypad, like +1-(123)-ANUMBER.

==== Short codes ====
Shortcodes offer very similar features to a dedicated virtual number but are short mobile numbers that are usually 5-6 digits. Their length and availability are different in each and every country. These are usually more expensive and are commonly used by enterprises and governmental organizations. For mass messaging, shortcodes are preferred over a dedicated virtual number because of their higher throughput and are great for time-sensitive campaigns and emergencies.

In Europe, the first cross-carrier SMS shortcode campaign was run by Txtbomb in 2001 for an Island Records release. In North America, it was the Labatt Brewing Company in 2002. Over the past few years, mobile short codes have been increasingly popular as a new channel to communicate to the mobile consumer. Brands have begun to treat the mobile shortcode as a mobile domain name, allowing the consumer to text message the brand at an event, in-store and off any traditional media.

Short codes provide a direct line between a brand and their customer base. Once a company has a dedicated short code, they are able to directly message their audience without worrying if the messages are being delivered, unlike long code D.I.D.s (Direct Inward Dial, another term for phone number). Whereas long code texts face a higher level of scrutiny, short codes give you unrivalled throughput without triggering red flags from the carriers.

==== SIM hosting ====
Physical and virtual SIM hosting allows a mobile number sourced from a carrier to be used for receiving SMS as part of a marketing campaign. The SIM associated with the number is hosted by a bulk SMS provider. With physical SIM hosting, a SIM is physically hosted in a GSM modem and SMS received by the SIM are relayed to the customer. With virtual SIM hosting, the SIM is roamed onto the Bulk SMS provider's partner mobile network and SMS sent to the mobile number are routed from the mobile network's SS7 network to an SMSC or virtual mobile gateway, and then onto the customer.

==== Custom sender ID ====
A custom sender ID, also known as an alphanumeric sender ID, enables users to set a business name as the sender ID for one-way organization-to-consumer messages. Custom sender IDs are only supported in certain countries and are up to 11 characters long, and support uppercase and lowercase ASCII letters and digits 0-9. Senders are not allowed to use digits only as this would mimic a shortcode or virtual number that they do not have access to. Reputable bulk SMS providers will check customer sender IDs beforehand to make sure senders are not misusing or abusing them.

=== Message size ===
The message size will then determine the number of SMS messages that are sent, which then determines the amount of money spent on marketing a product or service. Not all characters in a message are the same size.

Character Count	Character Type
1	Standard GSM character
1	Space
1	Line Break
2	Escape characters (e.g. ^ € { } [ ] ~ )

A single SMS message has a maximum size of 1120 bits. This is important because there are two types of character encodings, GSM and Unicode. Latin-based languages like English are GSM based encoding, which are 7 bits per character. This is where text messages typically get their 160 characters per SMS limit. Long messages that exceed this limit are concatenated. They are split into smaller messages, which are recombined by the receiving phone.

Concatenated messages can only fit 153 characters instead of 160. For example, a 177 character message is sent as 2 messages. The first is sent with 153 characters and the second with 24 characters. The process of SMS concatenation can happen up to 4 times for most bulk SMS providers, which allows senders a maximum of 612 character messages per campaign.

Non-Latin based languages, like Chinese, and also emojis use a different encoding process called Unicode or Unicode Transformation Format (UTF-8). It is meant to encompass all characters for efficiency but has a caveat. Each Unicode character is 16 bits in size, which takes more information to send, therefore limiting SMS messages to 70 characters. Messages that are larger than 70 characters are also concatenated. These messages can fit 67 characters and can be concatenated up to 4 times for a maximum of 268 characters.

Number of SMS	Maximum GSM characters	Maximum Unicode characters
1 regular	160	70
2 concatenated	306	134
3 concatenated	459	201
4 concatenated	612	268

=== Content structure ===
Special elements that can be placed inside a text message include:

- UTF-8 Characters: Send SMS in different languages, special characters, or emojis
- Keywords: Use keywords to trigger an automated response
- Links: Track campaigns easily by using shortened URLs to custom landing pages
- Interactive Elements: Pictures, animations, audio, or video

Texting is simple, however, when it comes to SMS marketing - there are many different content structures that can be implemented. Popular message types include sale alerts, reminders, keywords, and multimedia messaging services (MMS).

==== SMS sales alerts ====
Sale alerts are the most basic form of SMS marketing. They are generally used for clearance, flash sales, and special promotions. Typical messages include coupon codes, and information like expiration dates, products, and website links for additional information.

==== SMS Transaction alerts ====
Transaction alerts are used by financial institutions to notify their customer about a financial transaction done from their account. Some SMS messages only highlight the amount transacted while some also include the balance amount left in the account.

==== SMS reminders ====
Reminders are commonly used in appointment-based industries or for recurring events. Some senders choose to ask their recipients to respond to the reminder text with an SMS keyword to confirm their appointment. This can really help improve the sender's workflow and reduce missed appointments, leading to improved productivity and revenue.

==== SMS keywords ====
This allows people to text a custom keyword to a dedicated virtual number or short code. Through custom keywords, users can opt-in to service with minimal effort. Once a keyword is triggered, an autoresponder can be set to guide the user to the next step. They can also activate different functions, which include entering a contest, forwarding to an email or mobile number, group chat, and sending an auto-response.

Keywords also allow users to opt-in to receive further marketing correspondence. When using a long code number you face higher levels of scrutiny from Telecom Companies. When sending SMS messages through long code you are unable to send messages with a link in the first message. This is done at the carrier level to help cut down on spam. Using keyword responses, a company can create a bridge between themselves and the user. Carriers will recognize users responding to an SMS with a keyword as a conversation and will allow links to be delivered.

=== Spam compliance ===
Similar to email, SMS has anti-spam laws which differ from country to country. As a general rule, it's important to obtain the recipient's permission before sending any text message, especially an SMS marketing type of message. Permission can be obtained in a myriad of ways, including allowing prospects or customers to tick a permission checkbox on a website, filling in a form, or getting a verbal agreement.

In most countries, SMS senders need to identify themselves as their business name inside their initial text message. Identification can be placed in either the sender ID or within the message body copy. Spam prevention laws may also apply to SMS marketing messages, which must include a method to opt out of messages.

One key criterion for provisioning is that the consumer opts in to the service. The mobile operators demand a double opt-in from the consumer and the ability for the consumer to opt-out of the service at any time by sending the word STOP via SMS. These guidelines are established in the CTIA Playbook and the MMA Consumer Best Practices Guidelines which are followed by all mobile marketers in the United States. In Canada, opt-in became mandatory once the Fighting Internet and Wireless Spam Act came into force in 2014.

=== Message delivery ===
Simply put, SMS infrastructure is made up of special servers that talk to each other, using software called Short Message Service Centre (SMSC) that use a special protocol called Short Message Peer to Peer (SMPP).

Through the SMPP connections, bulk SMS providers (also known as SMS Gateways) like the ones mentioned above can send text messages and process SMS replies and delivery receipts.

When a user sends messages through a bulk SMS provider, it gets delivered to the recipient's carrier via an ON-NET connection or the International SS7 Network.

==== SS7 network ====
Operators around the world are connected by a network known as Signaling System #7. It is used to exchange information related to phone calls, number translations, prepaid billing systems, and is the backbone of SMS. SS7 is what carriers around the world use to talk to each other.

==== ON-NET routing ====
ON-NET routing is the most popular form of messaging globally. It is the most reliable and preferable way for telecommunications/carriers to receive messages, as the messages from the bulk SMS provider is sent to them directly. For senders that need consistency and reliability, seeking a provider that uses ON-NET routing should be the preferred option.

==== Grey routing ====
Grey routing is a term given to messages that are sent to carriers (often offshore) that have low cost interconnect agreements with other carriers. Instead of sending the messages directly to the intended carrier, some bulk SMS providers send it to an offshore carrier, which will relay the message to the intended carrier. At the cost of consistency and reliability, this roundabout way is cheaper, and these routes can disappear without notice and are slower. Many carriers do not like this type of routing, and will often block them with filters set up in their SMSCs.

==== Hybrid routing ====
Some bulk SMS providers have the option to combine more reliable grey routing on lower value carriers with their ON-NET offerings. If the routes are managed well, then messages can be delivered reliably. Hybrid routing is more common for SMS marketing messages, where timeliness and reliable delivery is less of an issue.

=== SMS service providers ===
The easiest and most efficient way of sending an SMS marketing campaign is through a bulk SMS service provider. Enterprise-grade SMS providers will usually allow new customers the option to sign-up for a free trial account before committing to their platform. Reputable companies also offer free spam compliance, real-time reporting, link tracking, SMS API, multiple integration options, and a 100% delivery guarantee. Most providers can provide link shorteners and built-in analytics to help track the return on investment of each campaign.

Depending on the service provider and country, each text message can cost up to a few cents each. Senders intending to send a lot of text messages per month or per year may get discounts from service providers.

Since spam laws differ from country to country, SMS service providers are usually location-specific. This is a list of the most popular and reputable SMS companies in each continent, with some information about the number of phones in use. Message pricing, message delivery, and service offerings also differ substantially from country to country.

==== Africa ====
Country	# Mobile Phones	Popular SMS Providers
Nigeria	190,121,232	Express Bulk SMS, SMS Portal Nigeria, Bulk SMS Nigeria
South Africa	103,500,500	SMS Portal, CM.com, Clickatell
Algeria	33,000,000	Innovative Txt, Broad Net SMS, My Cool SMS

==== Asia ====
Country	# Mobile Phones	Popular SMS Providers
China	1,321,930,000	Bysoft, EzTexting, Web2Asia
India	1,162,470,432	ACL Mobile Ltd, SMS Gateway Hub, SMS Gateway Center, Txt Local, Tubelight Communications, SMSCountry
Indonesia	236,800,000	Thai Bulk SMS, One Way SMS, Bulk SMS
Iran	78,600,000	Medianasms

==== Australia/Oceania ====
Country	# Mobile Phones	Popular SMS Providers
Australia	34,500,000	ClickSend, MessageMedia, Mobile Message, Kudosity
New Zealand	4,761,000	MessageMedia, Texta, Burst SMS, ClickSend

==== North America ====
Country	# Mobile Phones	Popular SMS Providers
United States of America	327,577,529	Vibes, Twilio, Tatango
Mexico	101,339,000	Nextel, Active Campaign, Expert Texting
Canada	31,210,628	Simply Cast, Modis Club, Clickatell

==== Europe ====
Country	# Mobile Phones	Popular SMS Providers
Germany	107,000,000	Txt Nation, Message Mobile, Burst SMS
Italy	88,580,000	Vola, E-BC, KDEV SMS
United Kingdom	83,100,000	MMG, Quicksms.com

==== South America ====
Country	# Mobile Phones	Popular SMS Providers
Brazil	284,200,000	Clickatell, Bulk SMS, Txt Nation
Argentina	56,725,200	Innovative Txt, Intis Telecom, Via Nett
Colombia	57,900,472	SMS Gateway, Clickatell, Bulk SMS

== MMS ==
MMS mobile marketing can contain a timed slideshow of images, text, audio and video. This mobile content is delivered via MMS (Multimedia Message Service). Nearly all new phones produced with a color screen are capable of sending and receiving standard MMS message. Brands are able to both send (mobile terminated) and receive (mobile originated) rich content through MMS A2P (application-to-person) mobile networks to mobile subscribers. In some networks, brands are also able to sponsor messages that are sent P2P (person-to-person).

A typical MMS message based on the GSM encoding can have up to 1500 characters, whereas one based on Unicode can have up to 500 characters. Messages that are longer than the limit are truncated and not concatenated like an SMS.

Good examples of mobile-originated MMS marketing campaigns are Motorola's ongoing campaigns at House of Blues venues, where the brand allows the consumer to send their mobile photos to the LED board in real-time as well as blog their images online.

== Push notifications ==
Push notifications were first introduced to smartphones by Apple with the Push Notification Service in 2009. For Android devices, Google developed Android Cloud to Device Messaging or C2DM in 2010. Google replaced this service with Google Cloud Messaging in 2013. Commonly referred to as GCM, Google Cloud Messaging served as C2DM's successor, making improvements to authentication and delivery, new API endpoints and messaging parameters, and the removal of limitations on API send-rates and message sizes. It is a message that pops up on a mobile device. It is the delivery of information from a software application to a computing device without any request from the client or the user. They look like SMS notifications but they reach only the users who installed the app. The specifications vary for iOS and Android users. SMS and push notifications can be part of a well-developed inbound mobile marketing strategy.

According to mobile marketing company Leanplum, Android sees open rates nearly twice as high as those on iOS. Android sees open rates of 3.48 percent for push notification, versus iOS which has open rates of 1.77 percent.

== App-based marketing ==
With the strong growth in the use of smartphones, app usage has also greatly increased. The annual number of mobile app downloads over the last few years has exponentially grown, with hundreds of billions of downloads in 2018, and the number of downloads expecting to climb by 2022. Therefore, mobile marketers have increasingly taken advantage of smartphone apps as a marketing resource. Marketers aim to optimize the visibility of an app in a store, which will maximize the number of downloads. This practice is called App Store Optimization (ASO).

The term app marketing has not yet been defined in a unified scientific definition and is also used in various ways in practice. The term refers on the one hand to those activities that serve to generate app downloads and thus attract new users for a mobile app. In some cases, the term is also used to describe the promotional sending of push notifications and in-app messages.

== In-game mobile marketing ==
Three recent trends in mobile gaming include interactive real-time 3D games, massive multi-player games and social networking games. This indicates a shift towards more complex gameplay. On the other hand, there are more "casual" games, including many mobile games.

Brands are now delivering promotional messages within mobile games or sponsoring entire games to drive consumer engagement. This is known as mobile advergaming or ad-funded mobile game.

In in-game mobile marketing, advertisers pay to have their name or products featured in the mobile games. For instance, racing games can feature real cars made by Ford or Chevy. Advertisers have been both creative and aggressive in their attempts to integrate ads organically in the mobile games.

One form of in-game mobile advertising is what allows players to actually play. As a new and effective form of advertising, it allows consumers to try out the content before they actually install it. This type of marketing can also attract the attention of users like casual players. These advertisements blur the lines between games and advertising, and provide players with a richer experience that allows them to spend their precious time interacting with advertising.

Interactive in-game mobile marketing can bring a higher conversion rate and faster conversion speed than general advertising. Games can also offer a stronger lifetime value by measuring the quality of potential consumers in advance. In-game mobile marketing can improve user stickiness compared to advertising channels such as stories and video.

=== QR codes ===
Two-dimensional barcodes that are scanned with a mobile phone camera. They can take a user to the particular advertising webpage a QR code is attached to. QR codes are often used in mobile gamification when they appear as surprises during a mobile app game and directs users to the specific landing page. Such codes are also a bridge between physical medium and online via mobile: businesses print QR codes on promotional posters, brochures, postcards, and other physical advertising materials.

== Bluetooth ==
Bluetooth technology is a wireless short range digital communication that allows devices to communicate without the now superseded RS-232 cables.

== Proximity systems ==
Mobile marketing via proximity systems, or proximity marketing, relies on GSM 03.41 which defines the Short Message Service - Cell Broadcast. SMS-CB allows messages (such as advertising or public information) to be broadcast to all mobile users in a specified geographical area. In the Philippines, GSM-based proximity broadcast systems are used by select Government Agencies for information dissemination on Government-run community-based programs to take advantage of its reach and popularity (Philippines has the world's highest traffic of SMS). It is also used for commercial service known as Proxima SMS. Bluewater, a super-regional shopping center in the UK, has a GSM based system supplied by NTL to help its GSM coverage for calls, it also allows each customer with a mobile phone to be tracked though the center which shops they go into and for how long. The system enables special offer texts to be sent to the phone. For example, a retailer could send a mobile text message to those customers in their database who have opted-in, who happen to be walking in a mall. That message could say "Save 50% in the next 5 minutes only when you purchase from our store." Snacks company, Mondelez International, makers of Cadbury and Oreo products has committed to exploring proximity-based messaging citing significant gains in point-of-purchase influence.

== Location-based services ==
Location-based services (LBS) are offered by some cell phone networks as a way to send custom advertising and other information to cell-phone subscribers based on their current location. The cell-phone service provider gets the location from a GPS chip built into the phone, or using radiolocation and trilateration based on the signal-strength of the closest cell-phone towers (for phones without GPS features). In the United Kingdom, which launched location-based services in 2003, networks do not use trilateration; LBS uses a single base station, with a "radius" of inaccuracy, to determine a phone's location.

Some location-based services work without GPS tracking technique, instead transmitting content between devices peer-to-peer.

There are various methods for companies to utilize a device's location.

1. Store locators: Utilizing the location-based feedback, the nearest store location can be found rapidly by retail clients.
2. Proximity-based marketing: Companies can deliver advertisements merely to individuals in the same geographical location, while location-based services send advertisements prospective customers of the area who may truly take action on the information.
3. Travel information: Location-based services can provide actual time information for the smartphones, such as traffic condition and weather forecast, then the customers can make the plan.
4. Roadside assistance: In the event of sudden traffic accidents, the roadside assistance company can develop an app to track the customer's real-time location without navigation.

== Ringless voice mail ==
The advancement of mobile technologies has allowed the ability to leave a voice mail message on a mobile phone without ringing the line. The technology was pioneered by VoAPP, which used the technology in conjunction with live operators as a debt collection service. The FCC has ruled that the technology is compliant with all regulations. CPL expanded on the existing technology to allow for a completely automated process including the replacement of live operators with pre recorded messages.

== User-controlled media ==
Mobile marketing differs from most other forms of marketing communication in that it is often user (consumer) initiated (mobile originated, or MO) message, and requires the express consent of the consumer to receive future communications. A call delivered from a server (business) to a user (consumer) is called a mobile terminated (MT) message. This infrastructure points to a trend set by mobile marketing of consumer controlled marketing communications.

Due to the demands for more user controlled media, mobile messaging infrastructure providers have responded by developing architectures that offer applications to operators with more freedom for the users, as opposed to the network-controlled media. Along with these advances to user-controlled Mobile Messaging 2.0, blog events throughout the world have been implemented in order to launch popularity in the latest advances in mobile technology. In June 2007, Airwide Solutions became the official sponsor for the Mobile Messaging 2.0 blog that provides the opinions of many through the discussion of mobility with freedom.

GPS plays an important role in location-based marketing.

== Privacy concerns ==
Mobile advertising has become more and more popular. However, some mobile advertising is sent without a required permission from the consumer causing privacy violations. It should be understood that irrespective of how well advertising messages are designed and how many additional possibilities they provide, if consumers do not have confidence that their privacy will be protected, this will hinder their widespread deployment. But if the messages originate from a source where the user is enrolled in a relationship/loyalty program, privacy is not considered violated and even interruptions can generate goodwill.

The privacy issue became even more salient as it was before with the arrival of mobile data networks. A number of important new concerns emerged mainly stemming from the fact that mobile devices are intimately personal and are always with the user, and four major concerns can be identified: mobile spam, personal identification, location information and wireless security. Aggregate presence of mobile phone users could be tracked in a privacy-preserving fashion.

== Classification ==
Kaplan categorizes mobile marketing along the degree of consumer knowledge and the trigger of communication into four groups: strangers, groupies, victims, and patrons. Consumer knowledge can be high or low and according to its degree organizations can customize their messages to each individual user, similar to the idea of one-to-one marketing. Regarding the trigger of communication, Kaplan differentiates between push communication, initiated by the organization, and pull communication, initiated by the consumer. Within the first group (low knowledge/push), organizations broadcast a general message to a large number of mobile users. Given that the organization cannot know which customers have ultimately been reached by the message, this group is referred to as "strangers". Within the second group (low knowledge/pull), customers opt to receive information but do not identify themselves when doing so. The organizations therefore does not know which specific clients it is dealing with exactly, which is why this cohort is called "groupies". In the third group (high knowledge/push) referred to as "victims", organizations know their customers and can send them messages and information without first asking permission. The last group (high knowledge/pull), the "patrons" covers situations where customers actively give permission to be contacted and provide personal information about themselves, which allows for one-to-one communication without running the risk of annoying them.
