= Boston Community Information System =

Retired news transmission system

The Boston Community Information System (also called BCIS or Boston COMINS) transmitted up-to-the-minute Associated Press and New York Times wire reports to subscribers in Boston from April 1984 to January 1988.

The Boston Community Information System was the first system to propose and implement "hybrid broadcasting", combining both push technology and pull technology.

The Boston Community Information System (BCIS) used an FM radio channel to broadcast news to people who decoded the information with radio receivers connected to personal computers.

The BCIS system was designed and implemented by David K. Gifford and his research group at MIT. In order to deny service to nonpaying customers, and in order to allow each customer to subscribe to any subset of information streams, Gifford developed a conditional access system that used a different randomly chosen ephemeral key to encrypt each news article, before broadcasting the encrypted article on a subcarrier of MIT's FM radio station WMBR. Unlike many other broadcast encryption systems, Gifford's cipher was unbroken for almost a decade, during the entire operation of the BCIS.
