= 2-hydroxyethylphosphonate:O2 1,2-oxidoreductase =

2-hydroxyethylphosphonate:O_{2} 1,2-oxidoreductase may refer to:

- 2-hydroxyethylphosphonate dioxygenase, an enzyme
- Methylphosphonate synthase, an enzyme
