= MPNS =

MPNS may refer to:

- MPNS (gene)
- Microsoft Push Notification Service
