= GQL =

GQL may refer to:

- Google Query Language, SQL-like language for retrieving entities and keys in Google Cloud Datastore
- Graph Query Language, an international standard property graph query language
- GraphQL, open-source data query and manipulation language for APIs, and a runtime for fulfilling queries with existing data

== See also ==
- Query language
