= Firebase =

Cloud computing company owned by Google

- Industry: Computing and development tools
- Founded: September 13, 2010
- Headquarters: United States
- Products: Building; Firebase ML; Cloud Functions; Authentication; Hosting; Cloud Storage; Realtime Database; Quality; Crashlytics; Performance Monitoring; Test Lab; App Distribution; Business; In-App Messaging; Google Analytics; Predictions; A/B Testing; Cloud Messaging; Remote Config; Dynamic Links
- Parent: Google
- Website: firebase.google.com

Firebase is a company that developed backend software. It was founded in San Francisco in 2011 and is incorporated in Delaware.

In 2014, Firebase was bought by Google. Its name continues as a set of backend cloud computing services and application development platforms provided by Google. It hosts databases, services, authentication, and integration for a variety of applications, including Android, iOS, JavaScript, Node.js, Java, Unity, PHP, and C++.

== History ==
Firebase evolved from Envolve, a prior startup founded by James Tamplin and Andrew Lee in 2011. Envolve provided developers an API that enables the integration of online chat functionality into their websites. After releasing the chat service, Tamplin and Lee found out that it was being used to pass application data that were not chat messages. Developers were using Envolve to sync application data such as game state in real time across their users. Tamplin and Lee decided to separate the chat system and the real-time architecture that powered it. They founded Firebase as a separate company in 2011 and it launched to the public in April 2012.

Firebase's first product was the Firebase Realtime Database, an API that synchronizes application data across iOS, Android, and Web devices, and stores it on Firebase's cloud. The product assists software developers in building real-time, collaborative applications.

In May 2012, a month after the beta launch, Firebase raised $1.1 million in seed funding from venture capitalists Flybridge Capital Partners, Greylock Partners, Founder Collective, and New Enterprise Associates. In June 2013, the company further raised $5.6 million in Series A funding from Union Square Ventures and Flybridge Capital Partners.

In 2014, Firebase launched two products: Firebase Hosting and Firebase Authentication. This positioned the company as a mobile backend as a service.

In October 2014, Firebase was acquired by Google. A year later, in October 2015, Google acquired Divshot, an HTML5 web-hosting platform, to merge it with the Firebase team.

=== Further development under Google ===
In May 2016, at Google I/O, the company's annual developer conference, Google introduced Firebase Analytics and announced that it was expanding its services to become a unified backend-as-a-service (BaaS) platform for mobile developers. Firebase now integrates with various other Google services, including Google Cloud Platform, AdMob, and Google Ads to offer broader products and scale for developers. Google Cloud Messaging, the Google service to send push notifications to Android devices, was superseded by a Firebase product, Firebase Cloud Messaging, which added the functionality to deliver push notifications to Android, iOS and web devices.

In July 2016 Google announced that it was acquiring the mobile developer platform LaunchKit, which specialized in app developer marketing, and would be folding it into the Firebase Growth Tools team. In January 2017, Google acquired Fabric and Crashlytics from Twitter to add those services to Firebase.

In October 2017 Google Cloud launched Firestore, a serverless document database which was subsequently adopted by Firebase as the successor to Firebase Realtime Database. Google also offers Firestore to its enterprise customers not wanting to take a dependency on Firebase ecosystem, as a standalone database, including a MongoDB-compatible API to address vendor lock-in concerns.

== User privacy controversies ==
Firebase software is claimed to be used by Google to track users without their knowledge. On July 14, 2020, a lawsuit was filed accusing Google of violating federal wire tap law and California privacy law. It stated that through Firebase, Google collected and stored user data, logging what the user was looking at in many types of apps, despite the user following Google's own instructions to turn off the web and app activity collected by the company. The lawsuit was dismissed in January 2022, with Chief US District Judge Richard Seeborg ruling that a promise to avoid collecting user data did not amount to a contract.

== See also ==
- Firestore
