= Comparison of WebSocket implementations =

The WebSocket protocol is implemented in different web browsers, web servers, and run-time environments and libraries acting as clients or servers. The following is a table of different features of notable WebSocket implementations.

	Client (library)	Server (library)	Version compared	Protocol (spec) version support	Protocol test report	License	Implementation: language, environment	API: language, environment	Self-hosted server	Text message support	Binary message support	API message-based	API frame-based	API streaming input-output	Flow-control framework	Automatic pongs for pings	Automatic heartbeat pings	Manual pings-pongs	Frame size limit
Google Chrome 15	Yes	No	15.0.874.8; 12 Sep 2011	8 (10)		Complex	C++, WebKit	JavaScript, HTML5	No	Yes	Yes	Yes	No	No, No	No	Yes	No	No	≥ 16 MB (memory-limited?)
Google Chrome 16	Yes	No	16.0.912; 13 Dec 2011	13 (17/RFC 6455)		Complex	C++, WebKit	JavaScript, HTML5	No	Yes	Yes	Yes	No	No, No	No	Yes	No	No	≥ 16 MB (memory-limited?)
Mozilla Firefox 7	Yes	No	7 beta 12 Sep 2011	8 (10)		MPL, GPL, LGPL	C++, Necko	JavaScript, HTML5	No	Yes	No	Yes	No	No, No	No	Yes	No	No	< 16 MB
Mozilla Firefox 11	Yes	No	11.0; 13 Mar 2012	13 (17/RFC 6455)		MPL, GPL, LGPL	C++, Necko	JavaScript, HTML5	No	Yes	Yes	Yes	No	No, No	No	Yes	No	No	< 2 GB (memory-limited?)
Achex WS	Yes	Yes	2.17; 17 June 2014	RFC 6455		Commercial	C++	C++, JavaScript	Yes	Yes	Yes	Yes	Yes	Yes	Yes	No	No	Yes	$2^{16}$
Kaazing WebSocket Gateway	Yes	Yes	5.0 Dec 2014	RFC 6455		APL2 (Community Edition), commercial (Enterprise Edition)	Java, JMS	JavaScript, Flash/Flex, Silverlight, Objective-C & iOS, Java, Java & Android, .NET, Xamarin	Yes	Yes	Yes	Yes	No	Yes	Yes	Yes	Yes	No	memory-limited, configurable
Lightstreamer	Yes	Yes	7.4.9; 20 Oct 2026	RFC 6455		Commercial, freeware	Java	JavaScript, Android, Java, Swift, iOS, macOS, tvOS, watchOS, visionOS, .NET Standard, C++, Python, Flash/Flex, Silverlight, J2ME	Yes	Yes	No	Yes	No	No	Yes	Yes	Yes	No	Data driven, configurable
MigratoryData	Yes	Yes	6.0.5; 29 Aug 2021	RFC 6455		Commercial	Java	JavaScript, iOS, Android, Java, C++, .NET, PHP, Node.js, Python	Yes	Yes	No	Yes	No	No, No	Yes	Yes	Yes	No	2^{63}, configurable
Mongoose	Yes	Yes	7.9; 24 Jan 2023	RFC 6455		GPL, commercial	C/C++	C/C++	Yes	Yes	Yes	Yes	Yes	Yes	Yes	Yes	No	Yes	2^{63}, configurable
noPoll	Yes	Yes	0.3.2; 28 aug 2015	RFC 6455		LGPL 2.1	ANSI C	ANSI C	Yes	Yes	Yes	Yes	Yes	Yes	No	Yes	Yes	Yes	memory-limited, configurable
POCO C++ Libraries	Yes	Yes	1.4.6; 23 Sep 2014	RFC 6455		Boost	C++, POCO C++ Libraries	C++	Yes	Yes	Yes	No	Yes	Yes	No	No	No	Yes	memory-limited, configurable
PowerWebSockets	Yes	Yes	15.176.5188; 26 Jun 2015	RFC 6455	Test report	Commercial	.NET	.NET Framework, .NET Compact Framework, Xamarin. iOS, Xamarin.Android, Windows Phone, Silverlight, Mono	Yes	Yes	Yes	Yes	No	Yes	Yes	Yes	Yes	Yes	memory-limited, configurable
QtWebSockets	Yes	Yes	1.0; 12 Nov 2013	RFC 6455		LGPL	C++, Qt	Qt	Yes	Yes	Yes	Yes	Yes	No	Yes	Yes	Yes	Yes	memory-limited, configurable
RingSocket	No	Yes	1.0; 13 Sep 2019	RFC 6455		MIT	C	C	Yes	Yes	Yes	Yes	No	No	Yes	Yes	No	No	unlimited/configurable
Resin	No	Yes	4.026; 29 Feb 2012	RFC 6455		GPL, commercial	Java, C	Java		Yes	Yes	Yes	No	Yes	No	Yes	No	No	memory-limited, configurable
WebSocketListener	No	Yes	2.1.3; 24 Nov 2014	RFC 6455		MIT	.NET, Mono	.NET, Mono	Yes	Yes	Yes	Yes	No	Yes	Yes	Yes	Yes	No	Configurable
Wt	No	Yes	3.2.0; 30 Nov 2011	0,7,8,13 (17)	? Report	GPL, commercial	C++, Boost Asio	C++		Yes	Yes	No	No	No	Yes	Yes	Yes	No	memory-limited, configurable
XSockets.NET	Yes	Yes	5.*	RFC 6455		Commercial	.NET	Server-languages: Windows (.NET), Unix-Linux (Mono) Client-languages: JavaScript, .NET, Mono	Yes	Yes	Yes	Yes	No	Yes	Yes	Yes	Yes	Yes	memory-limited, configurable
RIWA Gateway	Yes	Yes	2.01	RFC 6455		Commercial	Java	Java, Android, iOS, JavaScript	Yes	Yes	Yes	Yes	No	Yes	No	Yes	No	No	memory-limited, configurable
μWebSockets	No	Yes	v0.14.0 28 Mar 2017	RFC 6455	Test report	Apache License 2.0	C++, epoll, Libuv, Boost Asio	C++, JavaScript, Node.js	Yes	Yes	Yes	Yes	Yes	Yes	Yes	Yes	Yes	Yes	memory-limited, configurable, server focused missing client support
Boost.Beast	Yes	Yes	94; 30 July 2017	RFC 6455	Test report	Boost	C++, Boost Asio	C++	Yes	Yes	Yes	Yes	Yes	Yes	Yes	Yes	Yes	Yes	unlimited (packets streamed to user code), permessage-deflate also unlimited (chunked)
libwebsockets	Yes	Yes	2.4; 16 Oct 2017	RFC 6455 + RFC 7692	Test report	LGPL2 + SLE	C, libuv, libev, libevent, poll, external poll loop integration, OpenSSL, mbedTLS	C, HTML5, JavaScript	Yes	Yes	Yes	Yes	Yes	Yes, yes	Yes	Yes	Yes	Yes	unlimited (packets streamed to user code), permessage-deflate also unlimited (chunked)
websocket++	Yes	Yes	0.8.2; 20 Apr, 2020	RFC 6455		BSD	C++11	C++11	?	?	?	?	?	?	?	?	?	?	?
facil.io	Yes	Yes	0.7.1; 18 May 2019	RFC 6455		MIT	C	C	Yes	Yes	Yes	Yes	Yes	Yes, yes	Yes	Yes	Yes	Yes	configurable client to server limits. unlimited (chunked) server to client.
oatpp-websocket	Yes	Yes	1.3.0; 19 Nov 2021	RFC 6455		Apache License 2.0	C++11, Oat++	C++11, Oat++	Yes	Yes	Yes	Yes	Yes	Yes	Yes	No	No	Yes	unlimited (packets streamed to user code)
