= Google App Engine =

Cloud-based web application hosting service

- Developer: Google
- Release: April 7, 2008; 18 years ago
- Type: Platform as a service
- Website: cloud.google.com/appengine/

Google App Engine (also referred to as GAE or App Engine) is a cloud computing platform used as a service for developing and hosting web applications. Applications are sandboxed and run across multiple Google-managed servers. GAE supports automatic scaling for web applications, allocating more resources to the web application as the amount of requests increases. It was released as a preview in April 2008 and launched officially in September 2011.

Applications written in Go, PHP, Java, Python, Node.js, .NET, and Ruby are supported by the App Engine, and other languages can be supported at an additional cost. The free version of the service offers a standard environment with limited resources. Fees are charged for additional storage, bandwidth, or instance hours.

== Features ==
Google App Engine primarily supports Go, PHP, Java, Python, Node.js, .NET, and Ruby applications, although it can also support other languages via "custom runtimes".

Python web frameworks that run on Google App Engine include Django, CherryPy, Pyramid, Flask, and web2py as well as a Google-written web app framework and several others designed specifically for the platform that was created after the release. Any Python framework that supports the WSGI using the CGI adapter can be used to create an application, and the framework can be uploaded with the developed application. Third-party libraries written in Python may also be uploaded.

SDK version 1.2.2 added support for bulk downloads of data using Python.

App Engine's integrated Google Cloud Datastore database has a SQL-like syntax called "GQL" (Google Query Language). GQL does not support the join statement. Instead, one-to-many and many-to-many relationships can be accomplished using ReferenceProperty().

Google Cloud Firestore is the successor to Google Cloud Datastore and replaces GQL with a document-based query method that treats stored objects as collections of documents. Firestore was launched in October 2017.

=== Backends ===
In Google I/O 2011, Google announced App Engine Backends, which were allowed to run continuously and consume more memory. The Backend API was deprecated as of March 13, 2014, in favor of the Modules API. The Modules API introduced finer control over scaling, versioning, and resource allocation, allowing developers to run different parts of an application with distinct performance settings.

=== Google Cloud SQL ===
In October 2011, Google previewed a zero-maintenance SQL database, which supports JDBC and DB-API. This service allows creating, configuring, and using relational databases with App Engine applications. Google Cloud SQL supports MySQL 8.0, 5.7, and 5.6.

=== Restrictions ===
- Developers have read-only access to the file system on App Engine. Applications can use only virtual file systems.
- App Engine can only execute code called from an HTTP request (scheduled background tasks allow for self-calling HTTP requests).
- Users may upload arbitrary Python modules, but only if they are pure Python. C and Pyrex modules are not supported.
- Java applications may only use a subset (The JRE Class White List) of the classes from the JRE standard edition. This restriction does not exist with the App Engine Standard Java8 runtime.
- A process started on the server to answer a request can't last more than 60 seconds (with the 1.4.0 release, this restriction does not apply to background jobs anymore).
- Does not support sticky sessions (a.k.a. session affinity), only replicated sessions are supported including limitation of the amount of data being serialized and time for session serialization.

=== Application hosting ===
While other services let users install and configure nearly any *NIX compatible software, App Engine requires developers to use only its supported languages, APIs, and frameworks. Current APIs allow storing and retrieving data from the document-oriented Google Cloud Datastore database, making HTTP requests, sending e-mail, manipulating images, and caching. Google Cloud SQL can be used for App Engine applications requiring a relational MySQL compatible database backend.

Per-day and per-minute quotas place restrictions on bandwidth and CPU use, number of requests served, number of concurrent requests, and calls to the various APIs. Individual requests are terminated if they take more than 60 seconds or return more than 32MB of data.

== Portability concerns ==
Developers worry that the applications will not be portable from App Engine and fear being locked into the technology. In response, there are a number of projects to create open-source back-ends for the various proprietary/closed APIs of the app engine, especially the datastore.

AppScale automatically deploys and scales unmodified Google App Engine applications over popular public and private cloud systems and on-premises clusters. It can run Python, Java, PHP, and Go applications on EC2, Google Compute Engine, Azure, and other cloud vendors.

The Web2py web framework offers migration between SQL Databases and Google App Engine, however, it doesn't support several App Engine-specific features such as transactions and namespaces.

Kubernetes is an open-source job control system invented by Google to abstract away the infrastructure so that open-source (e.g. Docker) containerized applications can run on many types of infrastructure, such as Amazon Web Services, Microsoft Azure, and others.

== Usage quotas ==
Google App Engine requires a Google account to get started, and an account may allow the developer to register up to 25 free applications and an unlimited number of paid applications.

Google App Engine defines usage quotas for free applications. Extensions to these quotas can be requested, and application authors can pay for additional resources.

== See also ==
- AWS Elastic Beanstalk
- Google Apps Script
- Google Cloud Platform
- Heroku
- Microsoft Azure
- Oracle Cloud Platform
- Rackspace Cloud
- VMware

== Bibliography ==
- Sanderson, Dan (October 26, 2012), Programming Google App Engine (2nd ed.), O'Reilly Media, p. 536, ISBN 978-1449398262
- de Jonge, Adriaan (October 31, 2011), Essential App Engine: Building High-Performance Java Apps with Google App Engine (1st ed.), Addison-Wesley Professional, p. 304, ISBN 978-0-321-74263-6
- Guermeur, Daniel; Unruh, Amy (November 24, 2010), Google App Engine Java and GWT Application Development (1st ed.), Packt Publishing, p. 480, ISBN 978-1-84969-044-7
- Roche, Kyle; Douglas, Jeff (December 31, 2009), Beginning Java Google App Engine (1st ed.), Apress, p. 375, ISBN 978-1-4302-2553-9
- Sanderson, Dan (November 23, 2009), Programming Google App Engine (1st ed.), O'Reilly Media, p. 400, ISBN 978-0-596-52272-8
- Severance, Charles (May 22, 2009), Using Google App Engine (1st ed.), O'Reilly Media, p. 262, ISBN 978-0-596-80069-7
- Ciurana, Eugene (February 2, 2009), Developing with Google App Engine (1st ed.), Apress, p. 164, ISBN 978-1-4302-1831-9
