= BOSH (protocol) =

Transport protocol

Bidirectional-streams Over Synchronous HTTP (BOSH) is a transport protocol that emulates a bidirectional stream between two entities (such as a client and a server) by using multiple synchronous HTTP request/response pairs without requiring the use of polling or asynchronous chunking.

For applications that require both "push" and "pull" communications, BOSH is significantly more bandwidth-efficient and responsive than most other bidirectional HTTP-based transport protocols and AJAX. BOSH achieves this by avoiding HTTP polling, yet it does so without resorting to chunked HTTP responses as is done in the technique known as Comet. To date, BOSH has been used mainly as a transport for traffic exchanged between Jabber/XMPP clients and servers (e.g., to facilitate connections from web clients and from mobile clients on intermittent networks).

For "push", a BOSH client starts an HTTP request, but the server postpones sending a reply until it has data to send. After receiving a reply, the client immediately makes another request on the same HTTP connection, so the server can always send data to the client without waiting for the client to poll. If, while waiting for a reply, the client needs to send data to the server, it opens a second HTTP connection. There are at most two HTTP connections open at a time, one on which the server can send data as a reply and one on which the client can send data as a POST.

"Bidirectional-streams Over Synchronous HTTP (BOSH)" and "XMPP over BOSH" are stable standards of the XMPP Standards Foundation.

The second related standard XMPP Over BOSH (XEP-0206) defines how BOSH may be used to transport XMPP stanzas. The result is an HTTP binding for XMPP communications that is intended to be used in situations where a device or client is unable to maintain a long-lived TCP connection to an XMPP server.

== See also ==
- Push technology
- WebSocket
