= Firestore =

Cloud-based document database service

Google Firestore
- Developer: Google
- Release: 3 October 2017; 8 years ago
- Written in: C++ (core), Java, Python, Go, Ruby
- Platform: Google Cloud Platform
- Type: Document-oriented database
- License: Proprietary
- Website: cloud.google.com/firestore/

Firestore is a fully managed, enterprise-grade, serverless, document-oriented database service with MongoDB compatibility in the Google Cloud portfolio. Designed to store and query JSON-like document data, Firestore features automatic scaling, high availability, multi-region replication, and strong consistency.

While it is commonly used in conjunction with frontend and mobile applications through the Firebase integration, Firestore operates as a distinct enterprise database within the Google Cloud portfolio, offering dedicated server-side client libraries and an enterprise-grade execution engine for backend services.

== History ==
Firestore (formerly known as Cloud Firestore) was originally announced in beta on 3 October 2017, as a next-generation document store succeeding Google Cloud Datastore. It achieved General Availability (GA) on 31 January 2019, launching with a 99.999% availability SLA for multi-region deployments and integration with Stackdriver (now Cloud Monitoring).

=== Enterprise evolution and milestones ===
To transition Firestore from a mobile-backend-as-a-service (MBaaS) data store into a robust, enterprise-grade database, Google introduced several critical query, API, and architectural updates:

MongoDB API Compatibility (2025): In April 2025, Google announced a public preview of Firestore with MongoDB compatibility, allowing developers to migrate workloads and use existing MongoDB drivers, application code, and tools. This capability achieved General Availability (GA) on 26 August 2025, as part of the newly launched Firestore Enterprise edition.

Pipeline Query Support (2025–2026): In November 2025, Google previewed "Pipeline Operations" on the Enterprise edition. Chaining composable query stages (such as grouping, sorting, filtering, and projecting) brought Firestore's query capabilities closer to relational databases like PostgreSQL. The pipeline operations interface reached General Availability on 20 April 2026.

16MiB Document Support (2026): On 9 April 2026, Google added GA support for 16MiB documents within the Firestore MongoDB compatible API, upgrading the limit from the previous 4MiB ceiling to ensure parity with standard MongoDB limits.

Full-Text Search & Geospatial Search (2026): Concurrently with the General Availability of Pipeline Operations in April 2026, Google introduced native built-in full-text search (tokenizing fields and ranking results using relevance scoring engines) and geospatial search in public preview.

Data Manipulation Language (DML) (2026): In April 2026, pipeline-based update and delete stages (DML) were added to allow bulk updates directly on the database engine without relying on external compute resources like Cloud Functions.

== Architecture and technology ==
Firestore is architected as a distributed, multi-master transactional database. It decouples compute from storage, utilizing a high-performance replication layer that guarantees data integrity and high availability.

=== TrueTime consistency model ===
Unlike many NoSQL databases that opt for eventual consistency to scale out, Firestore offers strong external consistency. It achieves this by sharing its underlying storage and transaction architecture with Google Cloud Spanner.

Firestore utilizes Google's proprietary TrueTime API, which relies on synchronized, highly-available hardware configurations of GPS receivers and atomic clocks deployed across Google's global data centers. TrueTime bounds time-acquisition uncertainty (typically within a few milliseconds), allowing Firestore to assign monotonically increasing commit timestamps to distributed transactions.

This synchronization replaces the need for heavy inter-node coordination during read operations, ensuring that:

Reads are strongly consistent across multi-region replicas.

Transactions maintain serializability globally.

== Firebase integration vs. Server-side SDKs ==
A key characteristic of Firestore is its distinct operational separation between server-side development and client-side web or mobile applications.

Comparison of Firestore Developer Interfaces
| Interface Type | Access Layer | Supported Environments / Platforms | Primary Use Case |
|---|---|---|---|
| Server-side Client Libraries | Direct Google Cloud API | Node.js, Python, Go, Java, C++, PHP, Ruby, MongoDB drivers | Backend application logic, microservices, and server-side data processing. |
| Client-side SDKs | Firebase Integration Layer | iOS, Android, Web browsers, Flutter, Unity | Real-time data synchronization, offline persistence caching, and direct-from-client querying. |

=== Firebase integration ===
For web and mobile clients, Firestore integrates with Firebase. In this architecture, Firebase acts as a secure intermediary and real-time synchronization layer. Client applications use Firebase mobile and web SDKs to connect directly to the database. Security, authorization, and data validation are handled at the schema level via Firebase Security Rules, bypassing the need for an intermediate backend server.

=== Server-side client libraries ===
For traditional architectures, microservices, or server-side applications, Firestore provides native Google Cloud server-side SDKs. These SDKs bypass the client-centric Firebase synchronization protocols and connect directly to Firestore using Identity and Access Management (IAM) credentials. These libraries are optimized for high-throughput, low-latency transaction processing, and server-side analytics.

== See also ==
- Document-oriented database
- NoSQL
- Bigtable
- Spanner (database)
