= Notification service =

System for broadcasting alerts to multiple recipients

A notification service provides means to send a notice to many persons at once. For example, if a flood were likely, residents of a community could be warned it's time to evacuate. If a school were suddenly closed for the day, students or parents could be told not come to school, or told to report to an alternate location. American Airlines can notify passengers by cellphone two hours before a flight's departure with information on the flight's status and gate number.

When notification services are used for emergency notification, they are often called Emergency Mass Notification Services (EMNS). Notification services and emergency notification services can provide a wide range of options, including:

- Notifications may be by e-mail, telephone, fax, text messages, etc.
- Identical messages may be broadcast, or the messages may be personalized.
- The notification service equipment may be owned by the sender, or may owned by a service provider.
- A message may, or may not require a response.

== See also ==
- Apple Push Notification Service (APNs)
- Amazon Simple Notification Service (SNS)
- Android Cloud to Device Messaging (C2DM)
- Boomerang Software Framework
- Blackboard Connect
- Firebase Cloud Messaging (FCM)
- Google Cloud Messaging (GCM)
- Message queuing service
- SQL Server Notification Services
- Windows Push Notification Service (WNS)
