= 2-hydroxyethylphosphonate dioxygenase =

Class of enzymes

Identifiers
- EC no.: 1.13.11.72

Databases
- IntEnz: IntEnz view
- BRENDA: BRENDA entry
- ExPASy: NiceZyme view
- KEGG: KEGG entry
- MetaCyc: metabolic pathway
- PRIAM: profile
- PDB structures: RCSB PDB PDBe PDBsum
Search
- PMC: articles
- PubMed: articles
- NCBI: proteins

2-hydroxyethylphosphonate dioxygenase (EC 1.13.11.72, HEPD, phpD (gene)) is an enzyme with systematic name 2-hydroxyethylphosphonate:O_{2} 1,2-oxidoreductase (hydroxymethylphosphonate forming). This enzyme catalyses the following chemical reaction

2-hydroxyethylphosphonic acid
O_{2}
(hydroxymethyl)phosphonic acid
+
formic acid

2-hydroxyethylphosphonate dioxygenase contains non-heme-Fe(II) and is involved in the biosynthesis of phosphinothricin.
