= Methylphosphonate synthase =

Class of enzymes

Identifiers
- EC no.: 1.13.11.73

Databases
- IntEnz: IntEnz view
- BRENDA: BRENDA entry
- ExPASy: NiceZyme view
- KEGG: KEGG entry
- MetaCyc: metabolic pathway
- PRIAM: profile
- PDB structures: RCSB PDB PDBe PDBsum
Search
- PMC: articles
- PubMed: articles
- NCBI: proteins

Methylphosphonate synthase (EC 1.13.11.73, mpnS (gene)) is an enzyme with systematic name 2-hydroxyethylphosphonate:O_{2} 1,2-oxidoreductase (methylphosphonate forming). This enzyme catalyses the following chemical reaction:

2-hydroxyethylphosphonic acid
O_{2}
H_{2}CO_{3}
methylphosphonic acid

The carbon atom which is removed from 2-hydroxyethylphosphonic acid becomes carbonic acid. Methylphosphonate synthase is isolated from the marine archaeon Nitrosopumilus maritimus.
