= Pull technology =

Style of network communication where requests are sent by the client

Pull coding or client pull is a style of network communication, where the initial request for data originates from the client, and then is responded to by the server. The reverse is known as push technology, where the server pushes data to clients.

Pull requests form the foundation of network computing, where many clients request data from centralized servers. Pull is used extensively on the Internet for HTTP page requests from websites.

A push can also be simulated using multiple pulls within a short amount of time. For example, when pulling POP3 email messages from a server, a client can make regular pull requests, every few minutes. To the user, the email then appears to be pushed, as emails appear to arrive close to real-time. A trade-off of this system is that it places a heavier load on both the server and network to function correctly.

Many web feeds, such as RSS are technically pulled by the client. With RSS, the user's RSS reader polls the server periodically for new content; the server does not send information to the client unrequested. This continual polling is inefficient and has contributed to the shutdown or reduction of several popular RSS feeds that could not handle the bandwidth. For solving this problem, the WebSub protocol, as another example of a push code, was devised.

Podcasting is specifically a pull technology. When a new podcast episode is published to an RSS feed, it sits on the server until it is requested by a feed reader, mobile podcasting app, or directory. Directories such as Apple Podcasts (iTunes), The Blubrry Directory, and many apps' directories request the RSS feed periodically to update the Podcast's listing on those platforms. Subscribers to those RSS feeds via app or reader will get the episodes when they request the RSS feed next time, independent of when the directory listing updates.

== See also ==
- Push technology
- Client–server model
