= Push technology =

Method of network communication where requests are sent by the publisher

Push technology, also known as server push, is a communication method where the communication is initiated by a server rather than a client. This approach is different from the "pull" method where the communication is initiated by a client.

In push technology, clients can express their preferences for certain types of information or data, typically through a process known as the publish–subscribe model. In this model, a client "subscribes" to specific information channels hosted by a server. When new content becomes available on these channels, the server automatically sends, or "pushes," this information to the subscribed client.

Under certain conditions, such as restrictive security policies that block incoming HTTP requests, push technology is sometimes simulated using a technique called polling. In these cases, the client periodically checks with the server to see if new information is available, rather than receiving automatic updates.

== General use ==
Synchronous conferencing and instant messaging are examples of push services. Chat messages and sometimes files are pushed to the user as soon as they are received by the messaging service. Both decentralized peer-to-peer programs (such as WASTE) and centralized programs (such as IRC or XMPP) allow pushing files, which means the sender initiates the data transfer rather than the recipient.

Email may also be a push system: SMTP is a push protocol (see Push e-mail). However, the last step—from mail server to desktop computer—typically uses a pull protocol like POP3 or IMAP. Modern e-mail clients make this step seem instantaneous by repeatedly polling the mail server, frequently checking it for new mail. The IMAP protocol includes the IDLE command, which allows the server to tell the client when new messages arrive. The original BlackBerry, introduced in 1999, was among the earliest widely adopted wireless devices to offer push email.

Another example is the PointCast Network, which was widely covered in the 1990s. It delivered news and stock market data as a screensaver. Both Netscape and Microsoft integrated push technology through the Channel Definition Format (CDF) into their software at the height of the browser wars, but it was never very popular. CDF faded away and was removed from the browsers of the time, replaced in the 2000s with RSS (a pull system.)

Other uses of push-enabled web applications include software updates distribution ("push updates"), market data distribution (stock tickers), online chat/messaging systems (webchat), auctions, online betting and gaming, sport results, monitoring consoles, and sensor network monitoring.

== Examples ==
=== Web push ===
The Web push proposal of the Internet Engineering Task Force is a simple protocol using HTTP version 2 to deliver real-time events, such as incoming calls or messages, which can be delivered (or "pushed") in a timely fashion. The protocol consolidates all real-time events into a single session which ensures more efficient use of network and radio resources. A single service consolidates all events, distributing those events to applications as they arrive. This requires just one session, avoiding duplicated overhead costs.

Web Notifications are part of the W3C standard and define an API for end-user notifications. A notification allows alerting the user of an event, such as the delivery of an email, outside the context of a web page. As part of this standard, Push API is fully implemented in Chrome, Firefox, and Edge, and partially implemented in Safari as of February 2023.

=== HTTP server push ===
HTTP server push (also known as HTTP streaming) is a mechanism for sending unsolicited (asynchronous) data from a web server to a web browser. HTTP server push can be achieved through any of several mechanisms.

As a part of HTML5 the Web Socket API allows a web server and client to communicate over a full-duplex TCP connection.

Generally, the web server does not terminate a connection after response data has been served to a client. The web server leaves the connection open so that if an event occurs (for example, a change in internal data which needs to be reported to one or multiple clients), it can be sent out immediately; otherwise, the event would have to be queued until the client's next request is received. Most web servers offer this functionality via CGI (e.g., Non-Parsed Headers scripts on Apache HTTP Server). The underlying mechanism for this approach is chunked transfer encoding.

Another mechanism is related to a special MIME type called multipart/x-mixed-replace, which was introduced by Netscape in 1995. Web browsers interpret this as a document that changes whenever the server pushes a new version to the client. It is still supported by Firefox, Opera, and Safari today, but it is ignored by Internet Explorer and is only partially supported by Chrome. It can be applied to HTML documents, and also for streaming images in webcam applications.

The WHATWG Web Applications 1.0 proposal includes a mechanism to push content to the client. On September 1, 2006, the Opera web browser implemented this new experimental system in a feature called "Server-Sent Events". It is now part of the HTML5 standard.

=== Pushlet ===
In this technique, the server takes advantage of persistent HTTP connections, leaving the response perpetually "open" (i.e., the server never terminates the response), effectively fooling the browser to remain in "loading" mode after the initial page load could be considered complete. The server then periodically sends snippets of JavaScript to update the content of the page, thereby achieving push capability. By using this technique, the client doesn't need Java applets or other plug-ins in order to keep an open connection to the server; the client is automatically notified about new events, pushed by the server. One serious drawback to this method, however, is the lack of control the server has over the browser timing out; a page refresh is always necessary if a timeout occurs on the browser end.

=== Long polling ===
Long polling is itself not a true push; long polling is a variation of the traditional polling technique, but it allows emulating a push mechanism under circumstances where a real push is not possible, such as sites with security policies that require rejection of incoming HTTP requests.

With long polling, the client requests to get more information from the server exactly as in normal polling, but with the expectation that the server may not respond immediately. If the server has no new information for the client when the poll is received, then instead of sending an empty response, the server holds the request open and waits for response information to become available. Once it does have new information, the server immediately sends an HTTP response to the client, completing the open HTTP request. Upon receipt of the server response, the client often immediately issues another server request. In this way the usual response latency (the time between when the information first becomes available and the next client request) otherwise associated with polling clients is eliminated.

For example, BOSH is a popular, long-lived HTTP technique used as a long-polling alternative to a continuous TCP connection when such a connection is difficult or impossible to employ directly (e.g., in a web browser); it is also an underlying technology in the XMPP, which Apple uses for its iCloud push support.

=== Flash XML Socket relays ===
This technique, used by chat applications, makes use of the XML Socket object in a single-pixel Adobe Flash movie. Under the control of JavaScript, the client establishes a TCP connection to a unidirectional relay on the server. The relay server does not read anything from this socket; instead, it immediately sends the client a unique identifier. Next, the client makes an HTTP request to the web server, including this identifier with it. The web application can then push messages addressed to the client to a local interface of the relay server, which relays them over the Flash socket. The advantage of this approach is that it appreciates the natural read-write asymmetry that is typical of many web applications, including chat, and as a consequence it offers high efficiency. Since it does not accept data on outgoing sockets, the relay server does not need to poll outgoing TCP connections at all, making it possible to hold open tens of thousands of concurrent connections. In this model, the limit to scale is the TCP stack of the underlying server operating system.

=== Reliable Group Data Delivery (RGDD) ===
In services such as cloud computing, to increase reliability and availability of data, it is usually pushed (replicated) to several machines. For example, the Hadoop Distributed File System (HDFS) makes 2 extra copies of any object stored. RGDD focuses on efficiently casting an object from one location to many while saving bandwidth by sending minimal number of copies (only one in the best case) of the object over any link across the network. For example, Datacast is a scheme for delivery to many nodes inside data centers that relies on regular and structured topologies and DCCast is a similar approach for delivery across data centers.

=== Push notification ===
A push notification is a message that is "pushed" from a back-end server or application to a user interface, e.g. mobile applications or desktop applications. Apple introduced push notifications for iPhone in 2009, and in 2010 Google released "Google Cloud to Device Messaging" (superseded by Google Cloud Messaging and then by Firebase Cloud Messaging). In November 2015, Microsoft announced that the Windows Notification Service would be expanded to make use of the Universal Windows Platform architecture, allowing for push data to be sent to Windows 10, Windows 10 Mobile, Xbox, and other supported platforms using universal API calls and POST requests.

Push notifications are mainly divided into two approaches, local notifications and remote notifications. For local notifications, the application schedules the notification with the local device's OS. The application sets a timer in the application itself, provided it is able to continuously run in the background. When the event's scheduled time is reached, or the event's programmed condition is met, the message is displayed in the application's user interface.

Remote notifications are handled by a remote server. Under this scenario, the client application needs to be registered on the server with a unique key (e.g., a UUID or Apple Device Token). The server then transmits the message against the unique key to deliver it to the client via an agreed client/server protocol such as HTTP or XMPP. When the push notification arrives at the client, it can cause the display of short notifications or messages, set badges on application icons, blink or continuously light up the notification LED, or play alert sounds to attract user's attention. Push notifications are usually used by applications to bring information to users' attention. The content of the messages can be classified in the following example categories:

- Chat messages from a messaging application such as Facebook Messenger sent by other users.
- Vendor special offers: A vendor may want to advertise their offers to customers.
- Event reminders: Some applications may allow the customer to create a reminder or alert for a specific time.
- Subscribed topic changes: Users may want to get updates regarding the weather in their location, or monitor a web page to track changes, for instance.

Real-time push notifications may raise privacy issues since they can be used to bind virtual identities of social network pseudonyms to the real identities of the smartphone owners. The use of unnecessary push notifications for promotional purposes has been criticized as an example of attention theft.

== See also ==
- BlazeDS
- BOSH (protocol)
- Channel Definition Format
- Client–server model
- Comet (programming)
- File transfer
- GraniteDS
- HTTP/2
- Lightstreamer
- Notification LED
- Pull technology
- Push Access Protocol
- Push email
- SQL Server Notification Services
- Streaming media
- WebSocket
- WebSub
