= Sleep (system call) =

Computer system call

A computer program (process, task, or thread) may sleep, which places it into an inactive state for a minimum period of time. Eventually the expiration of an interval timer, or the receipt of a signal or interrupt causes the program to resume execution.

== Usage ==
A typical sleep system call takes a time value as a parameter, specifying the minimum amount of time that the process is to sleep before resuming execution. The parameter typically specifies seconds, although some operating systems provide finer resolution, such as milliseconds or microseconds.

=== Windows ===
On Windows, the Sleep() function takes a single parameter of the number of milliseconds to sleep. The Sleep() function is included in kernel32.dll.

The Sleep() function has a resolution no higher than the current timer resolution, typically 16ms but at minimum 1ms, adjustable via the timeBeginPeriod() family of "media timer" APIs. For higher precisions, it is necessary to use a busy loop over QueryPerformanceCounter(), such as the one used in gnulib.

=== Unix ===
On Unix-like and other POSIX operating systems, the sleep() function is called providing a single parameter of type unsigned integer of the number of seconds to sleep. A higher-precision version is the nanosleep() function and the now deprecated usleep. POSIX also allows for choosing clock sources via the extended version clock_nanosleep().

A version of clock_nanosleep() was proposed to be part of the C programming language, but was rejected. The UTC time part of the same proposal was added to C11.

=== C examples ===
In Windows API:

Sleep(2 * 1000);  // Sleep for 2 seconds

In Unix or POSIX system calls:

sleep(2);       // Sleep for 2 seconds

== Low level functionality ==
Sleep causes the thread or process to give up the remainder of its time slice and stay in the Not Runnable state for the specified duration. While there is generally a guarantee for the minimum time period, there is no strict guarantee that the thread will run immediately or soon, or even at all, once the specified time has passed. It is up to the scheduler's discretion, and dependent on thread priorities and implementation details such as timer resolutions when the sleeping thread will run again.

On POSIX systems, the nanosleep and related syscalls are interruptible by signals, returning the remaining sleep time. The sleep library function, on the other hand, is implemented via the alarm syscall on many older systems, thus it only works by delivering a signal. The Windows Sleep function is non-interruptible due to absence of signals (other than the thread or its process being terminated), although the related SleepEx function can be used to put the thread into an alertable state, allowing APC calls being made while the thread is sleeping. Also, a thread can technically be "interrupted" in case e.g. the process terminates due to an exception in a different thread.

== Uses ==
Some system programs that never terminate execute an event loop, going to sleep at the start of each cycle and waiting for some event to awaken them. Once an event is received, the program services the event, then returns to the beginning of the next wait cycle.

Other programs periodically poll for events by going to sleep and resuming execution after a specific interval of time. Once execution is resumed, the program polls for events or status changes, and then services any that occurred while it was asleep. After servicing the events, the program then goes to sleep again for the next time interval. Certain kinds of heartbeat events or keep-alive signals can be generated by these kinds of programs.

The sleep() function call can be repeatedly called for short periods of time to slow the execution of a running program or code. Throttling code in this manner provides a coarse mechanism for mitigating the effects of overheating hardware or easing timing issues for legacy programs. The downside to cycling sleep and running states rather than leveraging cycle emulation (via an emulator) to control the execution speed of software is that interactive software will acquire a notable stutter if too little time is spent awake, too much time is spent sleeping, or a combination of both.

=== Uninterruptible sleep ===
An uninterruptible sleep state is a sleep state that will not handle a signal right away. It will wake only as a result of a waited-upon resource becoming available or after a time-out occurs during that wait (if specified when put to sleep). It is mostly used by device drivers waiting for disk or network IO (input/output). When the process is sleeping uninterruptibly, signals accumulated during the sleep will be noticed when the process returns from the system call or trap.

In Unix-like systems the command 'ps -l' uses code "D" for the uninterruptible sleep state of a process. Such processes cannot be killed even with SIGKILL and the only non-sophisticated way to get rid of them is to reboot the system.

== See also ==
- Signal
- System time
- sleep (command)
- Sleep mode
- wait (system call)
