= PPID =

PPID may refer to:

- Peptidylprolyl isomerase D, an enzyme encoded within the PPID gene
- Pituitary pars intermedia dysfunction in horses.

== Computer Science ==
- Private Personal Identifier in Security Assertion Markup Language
- Parent process ID. Process identifier of the parent of a process.
