= Subshell =

Subshell may refer to:

- Subshell, of an electron shell
- Subshell, a child process launched by a shell in computing
