= Exit (command) =

Termination command of many command-line interpreters and scripting languages

exit
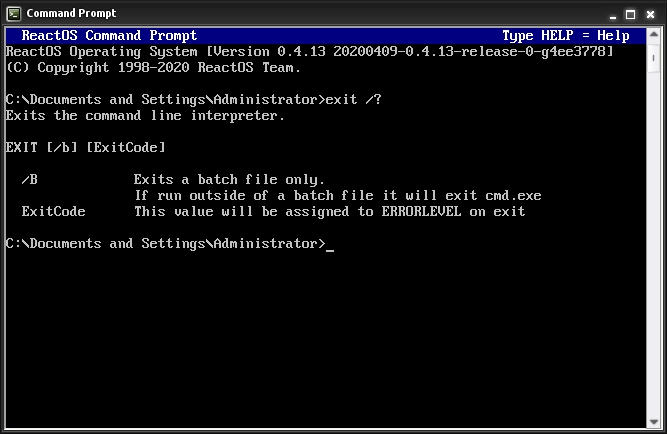
- The ReactOS exit command
- Developers: Various open-source and commercial developers
- Operating system: Cross-platform
- Type: Command

In computing, exit is a command used in many operating system command-line shells and scripting languages.

The command causes the shell or program to terminate. If performed within an interactive command shell, the user is logged out of their current session, and/or user's current console or terminal connection is disconnected. Typically an optional exit code can be specified, which is typically a simple integer value that is then returned to the parent process.

== Implementations ==
Operating systems, shells, and scripting languages providing this command include Microsoft MSX-DOS version 2, IBM OS/2, DR FlexOS, HP MPE/iX, KolibriOS, SymbOS, cmd.exe, sh, ksh, Perl, AWK, PHP, TCL, PowerShell, and others.

On MS-DOS, the command is available in versions 2 and later. DR DOS 6.0 and Datalight ROM-DOS also include an implementation of the exit command. It is also available in the open source MS-DOS emulator DOSBox.

The numerical computing environment MATLAB includes an exit function with similar functionality.

== See also ==
- exit (system call)
- Exit status
- List of Unix commands
- List of DOS commands
