= Spawn (computing) =

Function that loads and executes a new child process

In computer science, spawn is a function that loads and executes a new child process. The current process may wait for the child to terminate or may continue to execute concurrent computing. Creating a new subprocess requires enough memory in which both the child process and the current program can execute.

There is a family of spawn functions in DOS, inherited by Microsoft Windows.

There is also a different family of spawn functions in an optional extension of the POSIX standards.

== DOS/Windows spawn functions ==
The DOS/Windows spawn functions are inspired by Unix functions fork and exec; however, as these operating systems do not support fork, (Note: Windows Subsystem for Linux implements fork. Other POSIX environments such as Cygwin may have an implementation, but using it is not recommended due to the differences in the process model between POSIX and Windows. Fork is not part of the Windows API and most Windows programs do not use these environments, so do not have access to fork.) the spawn function was supplied as a replacement for the fork-exec combination. However, the spawn function, although it deals adequately with the most common use cases, lacks the full power of fork-exec, since after fork any process settings which will survive an exec may be changed. However, in most cases, this deficiency can be made up for by using the more low-level CreateProcess API.

In the spawnl, spawnlp, spawnv, and spawnvp calls, the child process inherits the environment of the parent. Files that are open when a spawn call is made remain open in the child process.

=== Prototype ===
int spawnl(int mode, char* path, char* arg0, ...);
int spawnle(int mode, char* path, char* arg0, ..., char* envp[]);
int spawnlp(int mode, char* path, char* arg0, ...);
int spawnlpe(int mode, char* path, char* arg0, ..., char* envp[]);
int spawnv(int mode, char* path, char* argv[]);
int spawnve(int mode, char* path, char* argv[], char* envp[]);
int spawnvp(int mode, char* path, char* argv[]);
int spawnvpe(int mode, char* path, char* argv[], char* envp[]);

==== Function names ====
The base name of each function is spawn, followed by one or more letters:

Letter	Notes
l	Command-line arguments are passed individually to the function.
v	Command-line arguments are passed to the function as an array of pointers.
p	Uses the PATH argument variable to find the file to be executed.
e	An array of pointers to environment arguments is explicitly passed to the child process.

==== Mode ====
The mode argument determines the way the child is run. Values for mode are:

Name	Notes
P_OVERLAY	Overlays parent process with child, which destroys the parent. This has the same effect as the exec* functions.
P_WAIT	Suspends parent process until the child process has finished executing (synchronous spawn).
P_NOWAIT, P_NOWAITO	Continues to execute calling process concurrently with new process (asynchronous spawn).
P_DETACH	The child is run in background without access to the console or keyboard. Calls to _cwait upon the new process will fail (asynchronous spawn)

==== Path ====
The path argument specifies the filename of the program to execute. For spawnlp and spawnvp only, if the filename does not have a path and is not in the current directory, the PATH environment variable determines which directories to search for the file. The string pointed to by argv[0] is the name of the program to run.

The command line passed to the spawned program is made up of the character strings, arg0 through argn, in the spawn call. The accepted maximum combined length of these strings differs between compilers, ranging from 128 characters on Digital Mars to 1024 on Microsoft Visual C++ or as much as memory permits, on DJGPP. The last argument after argn has to be a null pointer.

==== argv ====
The argv argument is an array of character pointers. The last pointer in the array must be null to indicate the end of the list.

==== envp ====
The spawnle, spawnlpe, spawnve, and spawnvpe calls allow the user to alter the child process's environment by passing a list of environment settings in the envp argument. This argument is an array of character pointers; each pointer (except for the last one) points to a null-terminated string defining an environment variable. An environment variable has the form:

name=value

where name is the variable name and value is its value. The last pointer in the array is null. When the envp argument is null, the child inherits the parent's environment settings.

Under Microsoft Windows, the spawn* functions use LoadModule to run the spawned process; and if this fails, an attempt is made to spawn a normal MS-DOS process. If a Windows application is spawned, the instance handle can be obtained using exec_instancehandleget. It is possible to specify how the spawned program will be shown using the functions _exec_showset, _exec_showget, and _exec_showreset.

=== Return values ===
The return value indicates the exit status of the spawned program. A value of zero indicates that the spawned program executed successfully. A positive value indicates that the spawned program executed, but was aborted or ended in error, the value returned is the exit status of the child process. A negative value indicates that the spawned program did not execute, and errno is set. Under Microsoft Windows, spawn returns the negated error code returned from LoadModule for compatibility with the C run-time library. The following error codes may be encountered:

Value	Notes
-2	File not found
-3	Path not found
-11	Invalid .exe file (for Windows)
-13	DOS 4. 0 application
-14	Unknown .exe type (may be DOS extended)

== POSIX spawn functions ==
The posix_spawn(3p) and its sibling posix_spawnp can be used as replacements for fork and exec, but does not provide the same flexibility as using fork and exec separately. They may be efficient replacements for fork and exec, but their purpose is to provide process creation primitives in embedded environments where fork is not supported due to lack of dynamic address translation; however, many Unix-like operating systems with full dynamic address translation support also implement them.

== History ==
The spawn metaphor, i.e., to produce offspring as in egg deposition, had its early use in the VMS, now OpenVMS, operating system (1977). In academia, there existed a lively debate between proponents of the Unix fork (crude copy of memory layout, but fast) versus VMS's spawn (reliable construction of process parameters, but slower). This debate revived when the VMS spawning mechanism was inherited by Windows NT (1993).

== See also ==
- Fork
- Exec
- fork-exec
- PATH (variable)
- Process.h
