= Exit (system call) =

Call by which a computer process terminates its execution

On many computer operating systems, a computer process terminates its execution by making an exit system call. More generally, an exit in a multithreading environment means that a thread of execution has stopped running. For resource management, the operating system reclaims resources (memory, files, etc.) that were used by the process. The process is said to be a dead process after it terminates.

== How it works ==
Under Unix and Unix-like operating systems, a process is started when its parent process executes a fork system call. The parent process may then wait for the child process to terminate, or may continue execution (possibly forking off other child processes). When the child process terminates ("dies"), either normally by calling exit, or abnormally due to a fatal exception or signal (e.g., SIGTERM, SIGINT, SIGKILL), an exit status is returned to the operating system and a SIGCHLD signal is sent to the parent process. The exit status can then be retrieved by the parent process via the wait system call.

Most operating systems allow the terminating process to provide a specific exit status to the system, which is made available to the parent process. Typically this is an integer value, although some operating systems (e.g., Plan 9 from Bell Labs) allow a character string to be returned. Systems returning an integer value commonly use a zero value to indicate successful execution and non-zero values to indicate error conditions. Other systems (e.g., OpenVMS) use even-numbered values for success and odd values for errors. Still other systems (e.g., IBM z/OS and its predecessors) use ranges of integer values to indicate success, warning, and error completion results.

=== Cleanup ===
The exit operation typically performs cleanup operations within the process space before returning control back to the operating system. Some systems and programming languages allow user subroutines to be registered so that they are invoked at program termination before the process actually terminates for good. As the final step of termination, a primitive system exit call is invoked, informing the operating system that the process has terminated and allows it to reclaim the resources used by the process.

It is sometimes possible to bypass the usual cleanup; C99 offers the _exit() function which terminates the current process without any extra program cleanup. This may be used, for example, in a fork-exec routine when the exec call fails to replace the child process; calling atexit routines would erroneously release resources belonging to the parent.

=== Orphans and zombies ===
Some operating systems handle a child process whose parent process has terminated in a special manner. Such an orphan process becomes a child of a special root process, which then waits for the child process to terminate. Likewise, a similar strategy is used to deal with a zombie process, which is a child process that has terminated but whose exit status is ignored by its parent process. Such a process becomes the child of a special parent process, which retrieves the child's exit status and allows the operating system to complete the termination of the dead process. Dealing with these special cases keeps the system's process table in a consistent state.

== Examples ==
The following programs terminate and return a success exit status to the system.

C:

#include <stdlib.h>

int main(void) {
    exit(EXIT_SUCCESS); // or return EXIT_SUCCESS
}

C++:

import std;

int main() {
    std::exit(0); // or return 0
}

COBOL:

 IDENTIFICATION DIVISION.
 PROGRAM-ID. SUCCESS-PROGRAM.
 
 PROCEDURE DIVISION.
 MAIN.
     MOVE ZERO TO RETURN-CODE.
 END PROGRAM.

Fortran:

program wiki
      call exit(0)
 end program wiki

Java:

public class Example {
    public static void main(String[] args) {
        System.exit(0);
    }
}

JavaScript (Node.js):

process.exit(0);

Pascal:

program wiki;
begin
        ExitCode := 0;
        exit
end.

DR-DOS batch file:

exit 0

Perl:

#!/usr/bin/env perl
exit;

PHP:

<?php
exit(0);

Python:

#!/usr/bin/env python3
import sys

if __name__ == "__main__":
    sys.exit(0)

Rust:

use std::process;

fn main() {
    process::exit(0);
}

Unix shell:

exit 0

16-bit assembly language for IBM PC compatibles:

; For MASM/TASM
.MODEL SMALL
.STACK
.CODE
main PROC NEAR
    MOV AH, 4Ch ; Service 4Ch - Terminate with Error Code
    MOV AL, 0 ; Error code
    INT 21h ; Interrupt 21h - DOS General Interrupts
main ENDP
END main ; Starts at main

Some programmers may prepare everything for INT 21h at once:

    MOV AX, 4C00h ; replace the 00 with your error code in HEX

Linux 32-bit x86 Assembly:

; For NASM
MOV AL, 1 ; Function 1: exit()
MOV EBX, 0 ; Return code
INT 80h ; # Passes control to interrupt vector
              # invokes system call—in this case system call
              # number 1 with argument 0

# For GAS
.text

.global _start

_start:
    movl $1, %eax  # System call number 1: exit()
    movl $0, %ebx  # Exits with exit status 0
    int $0x80      # Passes control to interrupt vector
                   # invokes system call—in this case system call
                   # number 1 with argument 0

Linux 64-bit x86 64 Assembly: for FASM

 format ELF64 executable 3
 
 entry start
 
 segment readable executable
 
 start:
     ; STUFF
     ; exiting
     mov eax, 60  ; sys_exit syscall number: 60
     xor edi, edi ; set exit status to 0 (`xor edi, edi` is equal to `mov edi, 0` )
     syscall      ; call it

OS X 64-bit x86 64 Assembly: for NASM

 
global _main

section .text

_main:
     mov rax, 0x02000001     ; sys_exit syscall number: 1 (add 0x02000000 for OS X)
     xor rdi, rdi            ; set exit status to 0 (`xor rdi, rdi` is equal to `mov rdi, 0` )
     syscall			     ; call exit()

== Windows ==
On Windows, a program can terminate itself by calling either the ExitProcess function or the RtlExitUserProcess function.

== See also ==
- exit (command)
- Child process
- Execution
- Exit status
- Fork
- Kill command
- Orphan process
- Process
- Parent process
- SIGCHLD
- Task
- Thread
- Wait
