= Code cave =

Series of unused bytes in a process's memory

A code cave is a series of unused bytes in a process' memory. The code cave inside a process's memory is often a reference to a section that has capacity for injecting custom instructions.
