= Tombstone (programming) =

Computer programming technique

Tombstones are a mechanism to detect dangling pointers and mitigate the problems they can cause in computer programs. Dangling pointers can appear in certain computer programming languages, e.g. C, C++ and assembly languages.

A tombstone is a structure that acts as an intermediary between a pointer and its target, often heap-dynamic data in memory. The pointer – sometimes called the handle – points only at tombstones and never to its actual target. When the data is deallocated, the tombstone is set to a null (or, more generally, to a value that is illegal for a pointer in the given runtime environment), indicating that the variable no longer exists. This mechanism prevents the use of invalid pointers, which would otherwise access the memory area that once belonged to the now deallocated variable, although it may already contain other data, in turn leading to corruption of in-memory data. Depending on the operating system, the CPU can automatically detect such an invalid access (e.g. for the null value: a null pointer dereference error). This supports in analyzing the actual reason, a programming error, in debugging, and it can also be used to abort the program in production use, to prevent it from continuing with invalid data structures.

In more generalized terms, a tombstone can be understood as a marker for "this data is no longer here". For example, in filesystems it may be efficient when deleting files to mark them as "dead" instead of immediately reclaiming all their data blocks.

The downsides of using tombstones include a computational overhead and additional memory consumption: extra processing is necessary to follow the path from the pointer to data through the tombstone, and extra memory is necessary to retain tombstones for every pointer throughout the program. One other problem is that all the code that needs to work with the pointers in question needs to be implemented to use the tombstone mechanism.

Among popular programming languages, C++ implements the tombstone pattern in its standard library as a weak pointer using std::weak_ptr. Built–in support by programming languages or the compiler is not necessary to use this mechanism.

== See also ==
- Locks-and-keys
- Multiple indirection
