= Process.h =

C header file

<process.h> is the C header file which contains function declarations and macros used in working with threads and processes. Most C compilers that target DOS, Windows 3.1x, Win32, OS/2, Novell NetWare or DOS extenders supply this header and the library functions in their C library. Neither the header file nor most of the functions are defined by either the ANSI/ISO C standard or by POSIX.

== History ==
Microsoft's version of the file dates back to at least 1985, according to its copyright statement. An early reference to the file was in a post on the net.micro.pc usenet on Oct-26-1986. The compiler used was Microsoft C compiler version 3.0. The Lattice C compiler version 3.30 (Aug-24-1988) did not have such a header file, but offered similar functions. Borland provided the header in their Turbo C compiler version 2.01. The C Ware-Personal C compiler version 1.2c (June 1989) had only the ANSI headers.

== Functions ==
| Name | Description | Notes |
|---|---|---|
| execl, execle, execlp, execlpe | load and execute a new child process by placing it in memory previously occupied by the parent process. Parameters are passed individually. | DOS, Win, OS/2, POSIX |
| execv, execve, execvp, execvpe | load and execute a new child process by placing it in memory previously occupied by the parent process. Parameters are passed as an array of pointers. | DOS, Win, OS/2, POSIX |
| spawnl, spawnle, spawnlp, spawnlpe | load and execute a new child process. Parameters are passed individually. | DOS, Win, OS/2 |
| spawnv, spawnve, spawnvp, spawnvpe | load and execute a new child process. Parameters are passed as an array of pointers. | DOS, Win, OS/2 |
| beginthread, beginthreadNT | creates a new thread of execution within the current process. | Win, OS/2 |
| endthread | terminates a thread created by beginthread. | Win, OS/2 |
| getpid | returns the process identifier. | DOS, Win, OS/2 |
| cexit | restore interrupt vectors altered by the startup code. | DOS, Win, OS/2 |

== Constants ==
| Name | Description | Notes | OS |
|---|---|---|---|
| _P_WAIT | Suspends parent process until the child process has finished executing. | synchronous spawn. | MS-DOS, Win32, OS/2 |
| _P_NOWAIT, _P_NOWAITO | Continues to execute calling process concurrently with new process. | asynchronous spawn. | Win32, OS/2 |
| _P_OVERLAY | Overlays parent process with child, which destroys the parent. | has the same effect as the exec* functions. | MS-DOS, Win32, OS/2 |
| _P_DETACH | The child is run in background without access to the console or keyboard. | Calls to _cwait upon the new process will fail. Asynchronous spawn. | Win32, OS/2 |
| _WAIT_CHILD | used as cwait action. | Obsolete on Win32. | MS-DOS, OS/2 |
| _WAIT_GRANDCHILD | used as cwait action. | Obsolete on Win32. | MS-DOS, OS/2 |

== Implementations ==
Given the fact there is no standard on which to base the implementation, the functions declared by process.h differ, depending on the compiler in use. Below is a list of compilers which provide process.h.

- DJGPP
- OpenWatcom,
- Digital Mars
- MinGW
- Microsoft Visual C++
- Borland Turbo C, 2.0 and later
- Lcc32
- QNX Neutrino QCC 6.x

== Differences ==
Another aspect that might vary is the combined length of exec* and spawn* parameters.

- Delorie DJGPP: does not have such a limit.
- Digital Mars: the maximum is 128 bytes; nothing is stated about the ending '\0' character.
- Microsoft cl: the argument list for the new process must not exceed 1024 bytes.
