= Command (Unix) =

Unix shell builtin

command
- Operating system: Unix and Unix-like
- Type: Command

command is a shell command for executing a command without invoking a function or alias that has the same name. The command line arguments consist of an inner command line to executed. If the first argument is the name of a function or alias as well as the name of a command, then normally the function or alias takes precedence, but when passed as an argument to command the inner command is invoked instead of the function.

The command is available on Unix and Unix-like operating systems. It is specified in the POSIX standard and is often implemented in Unix shells as a shell builtin function or alias.

== Examples ==
In the following, the ls command is run directly instead of invoking a function or alias with the same name.

$ command ls

== See also ==
- List of POSIX commands
