= Lefkowitz =

Lefkowitz, also written as Levkowitz or Lewkowicz, is a surname of German-Jewish & Polish-Jewish origin, meaning "son of Levko". Notable people with the surname include:

- Abraham Lefkowitz (1884–1976), Hungarian-born American labor union leader and teacher
- Bernard Lefkowitz, author, sociologist, and professor of journalism
- Chad Lefkowitz-Brown, American jazz saxophonist
- David Lefkowitz (1875–1955), American rabbi in Texas
- Glyph Lefkowitz, American open-source software programmer
- Hank Lefkowitz (1923–2007), American professional basketball player
- Irving Lefkowitz (1921–2015), American control engineer, professor
- Jay Lefkowitz (born 1962), American lawyer and Special Envoy for Human Rights in North Korea
- Joseph Lefkowitz (1892–1983), later known as Joseph Leftwich, British critic and translator of Yiddish literature into English
- Louis J. Lefkowitz (1904–1996), American lawyer and politician in New York
- Mary Lefkowitz, professor at Wellesley College in Massachusetts
- Michel Yehuda Lefkowitz (1913–2011), Russian Empire-born Israeli rabbi, and one of the heads of the Ponevezh yeshiva
- Nat Lefkowitz (1898–1983), American talent agency executive who served as co-chairman of the William Morris Agency
- Robert Lefkowitz, American physician, biochemist, and professor at Duke University
- Rochelle Lefkowitz, American businessperson, president and founder of Pro-Media Communications
- Helen Lefkowitz Horowitz, history professor at Smith College
- Rochelle Lefkowitz, President of Pro-Media Communications
- Glyph Lefkowitz, American open-source software programmer and creator of the Twisted (software) network programming framework
- Zalman King Lefkowitz (1924–2012), American film director, writer, actor and producer

== Fictional Characters ==
- Trevor Lefkowitz, a character on the TV show Ghosts
- Penny Lefkowitz a character from Nickelodeon's The Mighty B!
