= EventMachine =

- Original author(s): Francis Cianfrocca
- Initial release: April 13, 2006; 18 years ago
- Stable release: 1.2.7 / 12 May 2018; 6 years ago
- Repository: github.com/eventmachine/eventmachine
- Written in: Ruby
- Operating system: Microsoft Windows, OS X, Linux
- Type: Event-driven networking
- License: GPL or Ruby License

EventMachine is a software system designed for writing highly scalable applications for Ruby. It provides event-driven I/O using the reactor pattern. EventMachine is the most popular library for concurrent computing in the Ruby programming language.

== Example uses ==
EventMachine has been used to build a number of different libraries and frameworks in which concurrency is a performance concern. Some examples include:

- critical networked applications
- web servers and proxies
- email and IM production systems
- authentication/authorization processors

== See also ==
- Application server
- Netty (software)
- Node.js
- Twisted (software)
