= Reactor pattern =

Software design pattern for concurrent event handling

The reactor software design pattern is an event handling strategy that can respond to many potential service requests concurrently. The pattern's key component is an event loop, running in a single thread or process, which demultiplexes incoming requests and dispatches them to the correct request handler.

By relying on event-based mechanisms rather than blocking I/O or multi-threading, a reactor can handle many concurrent I/O bound requests with minimal delay. A reactor also allows for easily modifying or expanding specific request handler routines, though the pattern does have some drawbacks and limitations.

With its balance of simplicity and scalability, the reactor has become a central architectural element in several server applications and software frameworks for networking. Derivations such as the multireactor and proactor also exist for special cases where even greater throughput, performance, or request complexity are necessary.

== Overview ==
Practical considerations for the client–server model in large networks, such as the C10k problem for web servers, were the original motivation for the reactor pattern.

A naive approach to handle service requests from many potential endpoints, such as network sockets or file descriptors, is to listen for new requests from within an event loop, then immediately read the earliest request. Once the entire request has been read, it can be processed and forwarded on by directly calling the appropriate handler. An entirely "iterative" server like this, which handles one request from start-to-finish per iteration of the event loop, is logically valid. However, it will fall behind once it receives multiple requests in quick succession. The iterative approach cannot scale because reading the request blocks the server's only thread until the full request is received, and I/O operations are typically much slower than other computations.

One strategy to overcome this limitation is multi-threading: by immediately splitting off each new request into its own worker thread, the first request will no longer block the event loop, which can immediately iterate and handle another request. This "thread per connection" design scales better than a purely iterative one, but it still contains multiple inefficiencies and will struggle past a point. From a standpoint of underlying system resources, each new thread or process imposes overhead costs in memory and processing time (due to context switching). The fundamental inefficiency of each thread waiting for I/O to finish isn't resolved either.

From a design standpoint, both approaches tightly couple the general demultiplexer with specific request handlers too, making the server code brittle and tedious to modify. These considerations suggest a few major design decisions:

1. Retain a single-threaded event handler; multi-threading introduces overhead and complexity without resolving the real issue of blocking I/O
2. Use an event notification mechanism to demultiplex requests only after I/O is complete (so I/O is effectively non-blocking)
3. Register request handlers as callbacks with the event handler for better separation of concerns

Combining these insights leads to the reactor pattern, which balances the advantages of single-threading with high throughput and scalability.

== Usage ==
The reactor pattern can be a good starting point for any concurrent, event-handling problem. The pattern is not restricted to network sockets either; hardware I/O, file system or database access, inter-process communication, and even abstract message passing systems are all possible use-cases.

However, the reactor pattern does have limitations, a major one being the use of callbacks, which make program analysis and debugging more difficult, a problem common to designs with inverted control. The simpler thread-per-connection and fully iterative approaches avoid this and can be valid solutions if scalability or high-throughput are not required. (Note: That said, a rule-of-thumb in software design is that if application demands can potentially increase past an assumed limit, one should expect that someday they will.)

Single-threading can also become a drawback in use-cases that require maximum throughput, or when requests involve significant processing. Different multi-threaded designs can overcome these limitations, and in fact, some still use the reactor pattern as a sub-component for handling events and I/O.

=== Applications ===
The reactor pattern (or a variant of it) has found a place in many web servers, application servers, and networking frameworks:

- Adaptive Communication Environment (ACE)
- EventMachine
- Netty
- Nginx
- Node.js
- Perl Object Environment
- POCO C++ Libraries
- Spring Framework (version 5 and later)
- Tokio
- Twisted
- Vert.x

== Structure ==
UML 2 component diagram of a reactive application.

UML 2 sequence diagram of a reactive server.

A reactive application consists of several moving parts and will rely on some support mechanisms:

Handle
An identifier and interface to a specific request, with IO and data. This will often take the form of a socket, file descriptor, or similar mechanism, which should be provided by most modern operating systems.
Demultiplexer
An event notifier that can efficiently monitor the status of a handle, then notify other subsystems of a relevant status change (typically an IO handle becoming "ready to read"). Traditionally this role was filled by the select() system call, but more contemporary examples include epoll, kqueue, and IOCP.
Dispatcher
The actual event loop of the reactive application, this component maintains the registry of valid event handlers, then invokes the appropriate handler when an event is raised.
Event Handler
Also known as a request handler, this is the specific logic for processing one type of service request. The reactor pattern suggests registering these dynamically with the dispatcher as callbacks for greater flexibility. By default, a reactor does not use multi-threading but invokes a request handler within the same thread as the dispatcher.
Event Handler Interface
An abstract interface class, representing the general properties and methods of an event handler. Each specific handler must implement this interface while the dispatcher will operate on the event handlers through this interface.

== Variants ==
The standard reactor pattern is sufficient for many applications, but for particularly demanding ones, tweaks can provide even more power at the price of extra complexity.

One basic modification is to invoke event handlers in their own threads for more concurrency. Running the handlers in a thread pool, rather than spinning up new threads as needed, will further simplify the multi-threading and minimize overhead. This makes the thread pool a natural complement to the reactor pattern in many use-cases.

Another way to maximize throughput is to partly reintroduce the approach of the "thread per connection" server, with replicated dispatchers / event loops running concurrently. However, rather than the number of connections, one configures the dispatcher count to match the available CPU cores of the underlying hardware.

Known as a multireactor, this variant ensures a dedicated server is fully using the hardware's processing power. Because the distinct threads are long-running event loops, the overhead of creating and destroying threads is limited to server startup and shutdown. With requests distributed across independent dispatchers, a multireactor also provides better availability and robustness; should an error occur and a single dispatcher fail, it will only interrupt requests allocated to that event loop.

For particularly complex services, where synchronous and asynchronous demands must be combined, one other alternative is the proactor pattern. This pattern is more intricate than a reactor, with its own engineering details, but it still makes use of a reactor subcomponent to solve the problem of blocking I/O.

== Example ==
A handler is used to process actual business logic in a non-blocking fashion:

package org.wikipedia.examples;

import java.io.IOException;
import java.nio.ByteBuffer;
import java.nio.channels.SelectionKey;
import java.nio.channels.Selector;
import java.nio.channels.SocketChannel;

public class Handler implements Runnable {
    private enum State {
        READING,
        WRITING,
    }

    private final SocketChannel socketChannel;
    private final SelectionKey selectionKey;
    private final ByteBuffer buffer = ByteBuffer.allocate(1024);
    private State state = State.READING;

    public Handler(Selector selector, SocketChannel socketChannel) throws IOException {
        this.socketChannel = socketChannel;
        this.socketChannel.configureBlocking(false);
        this.selectionKey = this.socketChannel.register(selector, SelectionKey.OP_READ);
        this.selectionKey.attach(this);
        selector.wakeup();
    }

    @Override
    public void run() {
        try {
            if (state == State.READING) {
                read();
            } else if (state == State.WRITING) {
                write();
            }
        } catch (IOException e) {
            closeConnection();
        }
    }

    private void read() throws IOException {
        int bytesRead = socketChannel.read(buffer);
        if (bytesRead > 0) {
            buffer.flip();
            byte[] bytes = new byte[buffer.remaining()];
            buffer.get(bytes);
            String message = new String(bytes).trim();
            System.out.println("Received: " + message);
            buffer.clear();
            buffer.put(String.format("Echo: %s\n", message).getBytes());
            buffer.flip();
            state = State.WRITING;
            selectionKey.interestOps(SelectionKey.OP_WRITE);
        } else if (bytesRead < 0) {
            closeConnection();
        }
    }

    private void write() throws IOException {
        socketChannel.write(buffer);
        if (!buffer.hasRemaining()) {
            buffer.clear();
            state = State.READING;
            selectionKey.interestOps(SelectionKey.OP_READ);
        }
    }

    private void closeConnection() {
        try {
            selectionKey.cancel();
            socketChannel.close();
            System.out.println("Connection closed by client.");
        } catch (IOException e) {
            e.printStackTrace();
        }
    }
}

An acceptor accepts new incoming client connections, handing them over to a dedicated read/write buffer:

package org.wikipedia.examples;

import java.io.IOException;
import java.nio.channels.Selector;
import java.nio.channels.ServerSocketChannel;
import java.nio.channels.SocketChannel;

public class Acceptor implements Runnable {
    private final Selector selector;
    private final ServerSocketChannel serverSocketChannel;

    public Acceptor(Selector selector, ServerSocketChannel serverSocketChannel) {
        this.selector = selector;
        this.serverSocketChannel = serverSocketChannel;
    }

    @Override
    public void run() {
        try {
            SocketChannel socketChannel = serverSocketChannel.accept();
            if (socketChannel != null) {
                System.out.println("Accepted connection from: " + socketChannel.getRemoteAddress());
                Handler hn = new Handler(selector, socketChannel);
            }
        } catch (IOException e) {
            e.printStackTrace();
        }
    }
}

The reactor itself runs a continuous loop, using a selector to look for ready I/O events and dispatch to the registered handlers:

package org.wikipedia.examples;

import java.io.IOException;
import java.net.InetSocketAddress;
import java.nio.channels.SelectionKey;
import java.nio.channels.Selector;
import java.nio.channels.ServerSocketChannel;
import java.util.Iterator;
import java.util.Set;

public class Reactor implements Runnable {
    private final Selector selector;
    private final ServerSocketChannel serverSocketChannel;

    public Reactor(int port) throws IOException {
        selector = Selector.open();
        serverSocketChannel = ServerSocketChannel.open();
        serverSocketChannel.configureBlocking(false);
        serverSocketChannel.socket().bind(new InetSocketAddress(port));
        SelectionKey selectionKey = serverSocketChannel.register(selector, SelectionKey.OP_ACCEPT);
        selectionKey.attach(new Acceptor(selector, serverSocketChannel));
        System.out.println("Reactor started on port " + port);
    }

    @Override
    public void run() {
        try {
            while (!Thread.interrupted()) {
                selector.select();
                Set<SelectionKey> selectedKeys = selector.selectedKeys();
                Iterator<SelectionKey> iterator = selectedKeys.iterator();

                while (iterator.hasNext()) {
                    SelectionKey key = iterator.next();
                    dispatch(key);
                    iterator.remove();
                }
            }
        } catch (IOException e) {
            e.printStackTrace();
        }
    }

    private void dispatch(SelectionKey key) {
        Runnable handler = (Runnable) key.attachment();
        if (handler != null) {
            handler.run();
        }
    }
}

Then, as an application:

package org.wikipedia.examples;

public class Main {
    public static void main(String[] args) {
        try {
            Reactor reactor = new Reactor(8080);
            Thread t = new Thread(reactor);
            t.start();
        } catch (Exception e) {
            e.printStackTrace();
        }
    }
}

== See also ==
- C10k problem
- Event-driven programming
- Input/output
- libevent
- Reactive programming

Related patterns:

- Active object
- Observer pattern
- Proactor pattern, which allows mixing synchronous & asynchronous event handling
