= Wormhole (disambiguation) =

A wormhole is a hypothetical topological feature of spacetime.

Wormhole may also refer to:

- Bajoran wormhole, a wormhole located near the planet Bajor in the fictional Star Trek universe
- Wormholes: Essays and Occasional Writings, a book containing writings from four decades by the English author John Fowles
- Wormhole switching, a technique in computer science
- "Wormhole X-Treme!", an episode of the science fiction television series Stargate SG-1
- Wormholes (film), a 1992 animated short film by Stephen Hillenburg
- "Wormhole" (album), by drum and bass act Ed Rush & Optical
- Wormhole (protocol), a protocol for transferring files and text

== See also ==
- Wormholes in fiction
- Wormhole Physics (disambiguation)
- Through the Wormhole, a television documentary series hosted by Morgan Freeman
