= Network programming =

Network programming may refer to:

- Computer network programming
- Broadcast programming
