= Netty (software) =

Asynchronous event-driven network application framework for Java

- Original author: Trustin Heuiseung Lee
- Developer: Netty Project Community
- Stable release: 4.2.9 / 15 December 2025; 5 months ago
- Preview release: 5.0.0.Alpha5 / September 28, 2022; 3 years ago
- Written in: Java
- Type: Enterprise Integration Patterns Message Oriented Middleware
- License: Apache License 2.0
- Website: netty.io
- Repository: Netty Repository

Netty is a non-blocking I/O client-server framework for the development of Java network applications such as protocol servers and clients. The asynchronous event-driven network application framework and tools are used to simplify network programming such as TCP and UDP socket servers. Netty includes an implementation of the reactor pattern of programming. Originally developed by JBoss, Netty is now developed and maintained by the Netty Project Community.

Besides being an asynchronous network application framework, Netty also includes built-in implementations of SSL/TLS, HTTP, HTTP/2, HTTP/3, WebSockets, DNS, Protocol Buffers, SPDY and other protocols. Netty is not a Java web container, but is able to run inside one, and supports message compression. Netty has been actively developed since 2004.

Beginning with version 4.0.0, Netty also supports the usage of NIO.2 as a backend, along with NIO and blocking Java sockets.

== See also ==
- Application server
- Node.js
- Twisted (software)
- Apache MINA
- List of application servers § Java
