= Lewkowicz =

Lewkowicz is a surname of Polish origin, often Polish-Jewish, related to Lefkowitz.

It can refer to the following persons:

- Josef Lewkowicz (1926–2024), Polish-born Holocaust survivor and Nazi hunter
- Sampson Lewkowicz (born 1951), an Uruguayan-American boxing promoter and manager
- Sara Naomi Lewkowicz, an American photographer
- Sev Lewkowicz (born 1951), an English musical composer, producer, arranger and keyboard player
