= Proactor pattern =

Software design pattern for event handling

Proactor is a software design pattern for event handling in which long running activities are running in an asynchronous part. A completion handler is called after the asynchronous part has terminated. The proactor pattern can be considered to be an asynchronous variant of the synchronous reactor pattern.

== Interaction ==
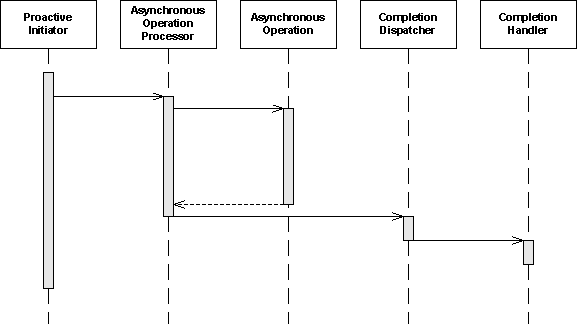
UML Sequence diagram of Proactor

Operation specific actors:

- The Proactive Initiator starts the asynchronous operation via the Asynchronous Operation Processor and defines the Completion Handler
- Completion Handler is a call at the end of the operation from the Asynchronous Operation Processor
- Asynchronous Operation

Standardized actors

- The Asynchronous Operation Processor controls the whole asynchronous operation
- The Completion Dispatcher handles the call, depending on the execution environment.

== Implementations ==
- Proactor and Boost.Asio (C++)
- Adaptive Communication Environment (C++)
- RJR (Ruby)

== See also ==
- Reactor pattern (a pattern that also asynchronously queues events, but demultiplexes and dispatches them synchronously)
