= DOM event =

Signal for Document Object Model

DOM (Document Object Model) Events are a signal that something has occurred, or is occurring, and can be triggered by user interactions or by the browser. Client-side scripting languages like JavaScript, JScript, VBScript, and Java can register various event handlers or listeners on the element nodes inside a DOM tree, such as in HTML, XHTML, XUL, and SVG documents.

Examples of DOM Events:

- When a user clicks the mouse
- When a web page has loaded
- When an image has been loaded
- When the mouse moves over an element
- When an input field is changed
- When an HTML form is submitted
- When a user presses a key

Historically, like DOM, the event models used by various web browsers had some significant differences which caused compatibility problems. To combat this, the event model was standardized by the World Wide Web Consortium (W3C) in DOM Level 2.

== Events ==
=== HTML events ===
==== Common events ====
There is a huge collection of events that can be generated by most element nodes:

- Mouse events.
- Keyboard events.
- HTML frame/object events.
- HTML form events.
- User interface events.
- Mutation events (notification of any changes to the structure of a document).
- Progress events (used by XMLHttpRequest and File API).

Note that the event classification above is not exactly the same as W3C's classification.

Category	Type	Attribute	Description	Bubbles	Cancelable
Mouse	click	onclick	Fires when the pointing device button is clicked over an element. A click is defined as a mousedown and mouseup over the same screen location. The sequence of these events is: mousedown; mouseup; click	Yes	Yes
Mouse	dblclick	ondblclick	Fires when the pointing device button is double-clicked over an element	Yes	Yes
Mouse	mousedown	onmousedown	Fires when the pointing device button is pressed over an element	Yes	Yes
Mouse	mouseup	onmouseup	Fires when the pointing device button is released over an element	Yes	Yes
Mouse	mouseover	onmouseover	Fires when the pointing device is moved onto an element	Yes	Yes
Mouse	mousemove	onmousemove	Fires when the pointing device is moved while it is over an element	Yes	Yes
Mouse	mouseout	onmouseout	Fires when the pointing device is moved away from an element	Yes	Yes
Mouse	dragstart	ondragstart	Fired on an element when a drag is started.	Yes	Yes
Mouse	drag	ondrag	This event is fired at the source of the drag, that is, the element where dragstart was fired, during the drag operation.	Yes	Yes
Mouse	dragenter	ondragenter	Fired when the mouse is first moved over an element while a drag is occurring.	Yes	Yes
Mouse	dragleave	ondragleave	This event is fired when the mouse leaves an element while a drag is occurring.	Yes	No
Mouse	dragover	ondragover	This event is fired as the mouse is moved over an element when a drag is occurring.	Yes	Yes
Mouse	drop	ondrop	The drop event is fired on the element where the drop occurs at the end of the drag operation.	Yes	Yes
Mouse	dragend	ondragend	The source of the drag will receive a dragend event when the drag operation is complete, whether it was successful or not.	Yes	No
Keyboard	keydown	onkeydown	Fires before keypress, when a key on the keyboard is pressed.	Yes	Yes
Keyboard	keypress	onkeypress	Fires after keydown, when a key on the keyboard is pressed.	Yes	Yes
Keyboard	keyup	onkeyup	Fires when a key on the keyboard is released	Yes	Yes
HTML frame/object	load	onload	Fires when the user agent finishes loading all content within a document, including window, frames, objects and images For elements, it fires when the target element and all of its content has finished loading	No	No
HTML frame/object	unload	onunload	Fires when the user agent removes all content from a window or frame For elements, it fires when the target element or any of its content has been removed	No	No
HTML frame/object	abort	onabort	Fires when an object/image is stopped from loading before completely loaded	Yes	No
HTML frame/object	error	onerror	Fires when an object/image/frame cannot be loaded properly	Yes	No
HTML frame/object	resize	onresize	Fires when a document view is resized	Yes	No
HTML frame/object	scroll	onscroll	Fires when an element or document view is scrolled	No, except that a scroll event on document must bubble to the window	No
HTML form	select	onselect	Fires when a user selects some text in a text field, including input and textarea	Yes	No
HTML form	change	onchange	Fires when a control loses the input focus and its value has been modified since gaining focus	Yes	No
HTML form	submit	onsubmit	Fires when a form is submitted	Yes	Yes
HTML form	reset	onreset	Fires when a form is reset	Yes	No
HTML form	focus	onfocus	Fires when an element receives focus either via the pointing device or by tab navigation	No	No
HTML form	blur	onblur	Fires when an element loses focus either via the pointing device or by tabbing navigation	No	No
User interface	focusin	(none)	Similar to HTML focus event, but can be applied to any focusable element	Yes	No
User interface	focusout	(none)	Similar to HTML blur event, but can be applied to any focusable element	Yes	No
User interface	DOMActivate	(none)	Similar to XUL command event. Fires when an element is activated, for instance, through a mouse click or a keypress.	Yes	Yes
Mutation	DOMSubtreeModified	(none)	Fires when the subtree is modified	Yes	No
Mutation	DOMNodeInserted	(none)	Fires when a node has been added as a child of another node	Yes	No
Mutation	DOMNodeRemoved	(none)	Fires when a node has been removed from a DOM-tree	Yes	No
Mutation	DOMNodeRemovedFromDocument	(none)	Fires when a node is being removed from a document	No	No
Mutation	DOMNodeInsertedIntoDocument	(none)	Fires when a node is being inserted into a document	No	No
Mutation	DOMAttrModified	(none)	Fires when an attribute has been modified	Yes	No
Mutation	DOMCharacterDataModified	(none)	Fires when the character data has been modified	Yes	No
Progress	loadstart	(none)	Progress has begun.	No	No
Progress	progress	(none)	In progress. After loadstart has been dispatched.	No	No
Progress	error	(none)	Progression failed. After the last progress has been dispatched, or after loadstart has been dispatched if progress has not been dispatched.	No	No
Progress	abort	(none)	Progression is terminated. After the last progress has been dispatched, or after loadstart has been dispatched if progress has not been dispatched.	No	No
Progress	load	(none)	Progression is successful. After the last progress has been dispatched, or after loadstart has been dispatched if progress has not been dispatched.	No	No
Progress	loadend	(none)	Progress has stopped. After one of error, abort, or load has been dispatched.	No	No

Note that the events whose names start with "DOM" are currently not well supported, and for this and other performance reasons are deprecated by the W3C in DOM Level 3. Mozilla and Opera support DOMAttrModified, DOMNodeInserted, DOMNodeRemoved and DOMCharacterDataModified. Chrome and Safari support these events, except for DOMAttrModified.

==== Touch events ====
Web browsers running on touch-enabled devices, such as Apple's iOS and Google's Android, generate additional events.

Category	Type	Attribute	Description	Bubbles	Cancelable
Touch	touchstart		Fires when a finger is placed on the touch surface/screen.	Yes	Yes
Touch	touchend		Fires when a finger is removed from the touch surface/screen.	Yes	Yes
Touch	touchmove		Fires when a finger already placed on the screen is moved across the screen.	Yes	Yes
Touch	touchenter		Fires when a touch point moves onto the interactive area defined by a DOM element.	Yes	Yes
Touch	touchleave		Fires when a touch point moves off the interactive area defined by a DOM element.	Yes	Yes
Touch	touchcancel		A user agent must dispatch this event type to indicate when a TouchPoint has been disrupted in an implementation-specific manner, such as by moving outside the bounds of the UA window. A user agent may also dispatch this event type when the user places more touch points (The coordinate point at which a pointer (e.g. finger or stylus) intersects the target surface of an interface) on the touch surface than the device or implementation is configured to store, in which case the earliest TouchPoint object in the TouchList should be removed.	Yes	No

In the W3C draft recommendation, a TouchEvent delivers a TouchList of Touch locations, the modifier keys that were active, a TouchList of Touch locations within the targeted DOM element, and a TouchList of Touch locations that have changed since the previous TouchEvent.

Apple didn't join this working group, and delayed W3C recommendation of its Touch Events Specification by disclosing patents late in the recommendation process.

==== Pointer events ====
Web browsers on devices with various types of input devices including mouse, touch panel, and pen may generate integrated input events. Users can see what type of input device is pressed, what button is pressed on that device, and how strongly the button is pressed when it comes to a stylus pen. As of October 2013, this event is only supported by Internet Explorer 10 and 11.

Category	Type	Attribute	Description	Bubbles	Cancelable
Pointer	pointerdown	onpointerdown	Fires when the pointing device button is activated, or pressed over an element.	Yes	Yes
Pointer	pointerup	onpointerup	Fires when the pointing device button is released over an element	Yes	Yes
Pointer	pointercancel	onpointercancel	Fires when a pointing device is unlikely to continue to produce event because, for example, the device is used for panning/zooming after a pointerdown event.	Yes	Yes
Pointer	pointermove	onpointermove	Fires when the pointing device is moved while it is over an element	Yes	Yes
Pointer	pointerover	onpointerover	Fires when the pointing device is moved onto an element	Yes	Yes
Pointer	pointerout	onpointerout	Fires when the pointing device is moved away from an element. Also fires after pointerup by pointing device without hovering, or after	Yes	Yes
Pointer	pointerenter	onpointerenter	Fires when the pointing device is moved onto an element, or when the button of the pointing device which does not support hovering is pressed on one of its descendant elements.	No	Yes
Pointer	pointerleave	onpointerleave	Fires when the pointing device is moved away from an element, or when the button of the pointing device which does not support hovering is released over its descendant elements.	No	Yes
Pointer	gotpointercapture	ongotpointercapture	Fires when the pointer is captured by setPointerCapture method.	Yes	No
Pointer	lostpointercapture	onlostpointercapture	Fires when the pointer is released by releasePointerCapture method.	Yes	No

==== Indie UI events ====
Not yet really implemented, the Indie UI working groups want to help web application developers to be able to support standard user interaction events without having to handle different platform specific technical events that could match with it.

Scripting usable interfaces can be difficult, especially when one considers that user interface design patterns differ across software platforms, hardware, and locales, and that those interactions can be further customized based on personal preference. Individuals are accustomed to the way the interface works on their own system, and their preferred interface frequently differs from that of the web application author's preferred interface.

For example, web application authors, wishing to intercept a user's intent to undo the last action, need to "listen" for all the following events:

- Control+Z on Windows and Linux.
- Command+Z on Mac OS X.
- Shake events on some mobile devices.

It would be simpler to listen for a single, normalized request to "undo" the previous action.

Category	Type	Description	Bubbles	Cancelable
Request	undorequest	Indicates the user desires to "undo" the previous action. (May be superseded by the UndoManager interface.)	Yes	Yes
Request	redorequest	Indicates the user desires to "redo" the previously "undone" action. (May be superseded by the UndoManager interface.)	Yes	No
Request	expandrequest	Indicates the user desires to reveal information in a collapsed section (e.g. a disclosure widget) or branch node in a hierarchy (e.g., a tree view).	Yes	Yes
Request	collapserequest	Indicates the user desires to hide or collapse information in an expanded section (e.g. a disclosure widget) or branch node in a hierarchy (e.g., a tree view).	Yes	Yes
Request	dismissrequest	Indicates the user desires "dismiss" the current view (e.g. canceling a dialog, or closing a popup menu).	Yes	Yes
Request	deleterequest	Indicates the user wants to initiate a "delete" action on the marked element or current view.	Yes	Yes
Focus Request	directionalfocusrequest	Initiated when the user agent sends a "direction focus" request to the web application. Web authors should not use or register for directionalfocusrequest events when standard browser focus and blur events are sufficient. Using these events unnecessarily could result in reduced performance or negative user experience.	Yes	Yes
Focus Request	linearfocusrequest	Initiated when the user agent sends a "linear focus" request to the web application. Web authors should not use or register for linearfocusrequest events when standard browser focus and blur events are sufficient. This event type is only necessary on specialized control types such as data grids where the logical next element may not be focusable or even in the DOM until requested. Using these events unnecessarily could result in reduced performance or negative user experience.	Yes	Yes
Focus Request	palettefocusrequest	Initiated when the user agent sends a "palette focus" request to the web application. Web app authors receiving this event should move focus to the first palette in the web application, or cycle focus between all available palettes. Note: palettes are sometimes referred to as non-modal dialogs or inspector windows.	Yes	Yes
Focus Request	toolbarfocusrequest	Initiated when the user agent sends a "toolbar focus" request to the web application. Web app authors receiving this event should move focus to the main toolbar in the web application, or cycle focus between all available toolbars.	Yes	Yes
Manipulation Request	moverequest	Initiated when the user agent sends a move request to the web application with accompanying x/y delta values. This is used, for example, when moving an object to a new location on a layout canvas.	Yes	Yes
Manipulation Request	panrequest	Initiated when the user agent sends a pan request to the web application with accompanying x/y delta values. This is used, for example, when changing the center point while panning a map or another custom image viewer.	Yes	Yes
Manipulation Request	rotationrequest	Initiated when the user agent sends a rotation request to the web application with accompanying origin x/y values and a rotation value in degrees.	Yes	Yes
Manipulation Request	zoomrequest	Initiated when the user agent sends a zoom request to the web application with accompanying origin x/y values and the zoom scale factor.	Yes	Yes
Scroll Request	scrollrequest	Initiated when the user agent sends a scroll request to the web application with accompanying x/y delta values or one of the other defined scrollType values. Authors should only use this event and uiaction with custom scroll views.	Yes	Yes
ValueChange Request	valuechangerequest	Initiated when the user agent sends a value change request to the web application. Used on custom range controls like sliders, carousels, etc.	Yes	Yes

==== Internet Explorer-specific events ====
In addition to the common (W3C) events, two major types of events are added by Internet Explorer. Some of the events have been implemented as de facto standards by other browsers.

- Clipboard events.
- Data binding events.

Category	Type	Attribute	Description	Bubbles	Cancelable
Clipboard	cut	oncut	Fires after a selection is cut to the clipboard.	Yes	Yes
Clipboard	copy	oncopy	Fires after a selection is copied to the clipboard.	Yes	Yes
Clipboard	paste	onpaste	Fires after a selection is pasted from the clipboard.	Yes	Yes
Clipboard	beforecut	onbeforecut	Fires before a selection is cut to the clipboard.	Yes	Yes
Clipboard	beforecopy	onbeforecopy	Fires before a selection is copied to the clipboard.	Yes	Yes
Clipboard	beforepaste	onbeforepaste	Fires before a selection is pasted from the clipboard.	Yes	Yes
Data binding	afterupdate	onafterupdate	Fires immediately after a databound object has been updated.	Yes	No
Data binding	beforeupdate	onbeforeupdate	Fires before a data source is updated.	Yes	Yes
Data binding	cellchange	oncellchange	Fires when a data source has changed.	Yes	No
Data binding	dataavailable	ondataavailable	Fires when new data from a data source become available.	Yes	No
Data binding	datasetchanged	ondatasetchanged	Fires when content at a data source has changed.	Yes	No
Data binding	datasetcomplete	ondatasetcomplete	Fires when transfer of data from the data source has completed.	Yes	No
Data binding	errorupdate	onerrorupdate	Fires if an error occurs while updating a data field.	Yes	No
Data binding	rowenter	onrowenter	Fires when a new row of data from the data source is available.	Yes	No
Data binding	rowexit	onrowexit	Fires when a row of data from the data source has just finished.	No	Yes
Data binding	rowsdelete	onrowsdelete	Fires when a row of data from the data source is deleted.	Yes	No
Data binding	rowinserted	onrowinserted	Fires when a row of data from the data source is inserted.	Yes	No
Mouse	contextmenu	oncontextmenu	Fires when the context menu is shown.	Yes	Yes
Mouse	drag	ondrag	Fires when during a mouse drag (on the moving Element).	Yes	Yes
Mouse	dragstart	ondragstart	Fires when a mouse drag begins (on the moving Element).	Yes	Yes
Mouse	dragenter	ondragenter	Fires when something is dragged onto an area (on the target Element).	Yes	Yes
Mouse	dragover	ondragover	Fires when a drag is held over an area (on the target Element).	Yes	Yes
Mouse	dragleave	ondragleave	Fires when something is dragged out of an area (on the target Element).	Yes	Yes
Mouse	dragend	ondragend	Fires when a mouse drag ends (on the moving Element).	Yes	Yes
Mouse	drop	ondrop	Fires when a mouse button is released over a valid target during a drag (on the target Element).	Yes	Yes
Mouse	selectstart	onselectstart	Fires when the user starts to select text.	Yes	Yes
Keyboard	help	onhelp	Fires when the user initiates help.	Yes	Yes
HTML frame/object	beforeunload	onbeforeunload	Fires before a document is unloaded.	No	Yes
HTML frame/object	stop	onstop	Fires when the user stops loading the object. (unlike abort, stop event can be attached to document)	No	No
HTML form	beforeeditfocus	onbeforeeditfocus	Fires before an element gains focus for editing.	Yes	Yes
Marquee	start	onstart	Fires when a marquee begins a new loop.	No	No
Marquee	finish	onfinish	Fires when marquee looping is complete.	No	Yes
Marquee	bounce	onbounce	Fires when a scrolling marquee bounces back in the other direction.	No	Yes
Miscellaneous	beforeprint	onbeforeprint	Fires before a document is printed	No	No
Miscellaneous	afterprint	onafterprint	Fires immediately after the document prints.	No	No
Miscellaneous	propertychange	onpropertychange	Fires when the property of an object is changed.	No	No
Miscellaneous	filterchange	onfilterchange	Fires when a filter changes properties or finishes a transition.	No	No
Miscellaneous	readystatechange	onreadystatechange	Fires when the readyState property of an element changes.	No	No
Miscellaneous	losecapture	onlosecapture	Fires when the releaseCapture method is invoked.	No	No

Note that Mozilla, Safari and Opera also support the readystatechange event for the XMLHttpRequest object. Mozilla also supports the beforeunload event using the traditional event registration method (DOM Level 0). Mozilla and Safari also support contextmenu, but Internet Explorer for Mac does not.

Note that Firefox 6 and later support the beforeprint and afterprint events.

=== XUL events ===
In addition to the common (W3C) events, Mozilla defined a set of events that work only with XUL elements.

Category	Type	Attribute	Description	Bubbles	Cancelable
Mouse	DOMMouseScroll	DOMMouseScroll	Fires when the mouse wheel is moved, causing the content to scroll.	Yes	Yes
Mouse	dragdrop	ondragdrop	Fires when the user releases the mouse button to drop an object being dragged.	No	No
Mouse	dragenter	ondragenter	Fires when the mouse pointer first moves over an element during a drag. It is similar to the mouseover event but occurs while dragging.	No	No
Mouse	dragexit	ondragexit	Fires when the mouse pointer moves away from an element during a drag. It is also called after a drop on an element. It is similar to the mouseout event but occurs during a drag.	No	No
Mouse	draggesture	ondraggesture	Fires when the user starts dragging the element, usually by holding down the mouse button and moving the mouse.	No	No
Mouse	dragover	ondragover	Related to the mousemove event, this event is fired while something is being dragged over an element.	No	No
Input	CheckboxStateChange		Fires when a checkbox is checked or unchecked, either by the user or a script.	No	No
Input	RadioStateChange		Fires when a radio button is selected, either by the user or a script.	No	No
Input	close	onclose	Fires when a request has been made to close the window.	No	Yes
Input	command	oncommand	Similar to W3C DOMActivate event. Fires when an element is activated, for instance, through a mouse click or a keypress.	No	No
Input	input	oninput	Fires when a user enters text in a textbox.	Yes	No
User interface	DOMMenuItemActive	DOMMenuItemActive	Fires when a menu or menuitem is hovered over, or highlighted.	Yes	No
User interface	DOMMenuItemInactive	DOMMenuItemInactive	Fires when a menu or menuitem is no longer being hovered over, or highlighted.	Yes	No
User interface	contextmenu	oncontextmenu	Fires when the user requests to open the context menu for the element. The action to do this varies by platform, but it will typically be a right click.	No	Yes
User interface	overflow	onoverflow	Fires a box or other layout element when there is not enough space to display it at full size.	No	No
User interface	overflowchanged	onoverflowchanged	Fires when the overflow state changes.	No	No
User interface	underflow	onunderflow	Fires to an element when there becomes enough space to display it at full size.	No	No
User interface	popuphidden	onpopuphidden	Fires to a popup after it has been hidden.	No	No
User interface	popuphiding	onpopuphiding	Fires to a popup when it is about to be hidden.	No	No
User interface	popupshowing	onpopupshowing	Fires to a popup just before it is popped open.	No	Yes
User interface	popupshown	onpopupshown	Fires to a popup after it has been opened, much like the onload event is sent to a window when it is opened.	No	No
Command	broadcast	onbroadcast	Placed on an observer. The broadcast event is sent when the attributes of the broadcaster being listened to are changed.	No	No
Command	commandupdate	oncommandupdate	Fires when a command update occurs.	No	No

=== Other events ===
For Mozilla and Opera 9, there are also undocumented events known as DOMContentLoaded and DOMFrameContentLoaded which fire when the DOM content is loaded. These are different from "load" as they fire before the loading of related files (e.g., images). However, DOMContentLoaded has been added to the HTML 5 specification. The DOMContentLoaded event was also implemented in the Webkit rendering engine build 500+. This correlates to all versions of Google Chrome and Safari 3.1+. DOMContentLoaded is also implemented in Internet Explorer 9.

Opera 9 also supports the Web Forms 2.0 events DOMControlValueChanged, invalid, forminput and formchange.

== Event flow ==
Consider the situation when two event targets participate in a tree. Both have event listeners registered on the same event type, say "click". When the user clicks on the inner element, there are two possible ways to handle it:

- Trigger the elements from outer to inner (event capturing). This model is implemented in Netscape Navigator.
- Trigger the elements from inner to outer (event bubbling). This model is implemented in Internet Explorer and other browsers.

W3C takes a middle position in this struggle.

According to the W3C, events go through three phases when an event target participates in a tree:

1. The capture phase: the event travels down from the root event target to the target of an event
2. The target phase: the event travels through the event target
3. The bubble phase (optional): the event travels back up from the target of an event to the root event target. The bubble phase will only occur for events that bubble (where event.bubbles == true)

You can find a visualization of this event flow at https://domevents.dev

=== Stopping events ===
While an event is travelling through event listeners, the event can be stopped with event.stopPropagation() or event.stopImmediatePropagation()

- event.stopPropagation(): the event is stopped after all event listeners attached to the current event target in the current event phase are finished
- event.stopImmediatePropagation(): the event is stopped immediately and no further event listeners are executed

When an event is stopped it will no longer travel along the event path. Stopping an event does not cancel an event.

==== Legacy mechanisms to stop an event ====
- Set the event.cancelBubble to true (Internet Explorer)
- Set the event.returnValue property to false

=== Canceling events ===
A cancelable event can be canceled by calling event.preventDefault(). Canceling an event will opt out of the default browser behaviour for that event. When an event is canceled, the event.defaultPrevented property will be set to true. Canceling an event will not stop the event from traveling along the event path.

== Event object ==
The Event object provides a lot of information about a particular event, including information about target element, key pressed, mouse button pressed, mouse position, etc. Unfortunately, there are very serious browser incompatibilities in this area. Hence only the W3C Event object is discussed in this article.

Event properties
Name	Type	Description
type	DOMString	The name of the event (case-insensitive in DOM level 2 but case-sensitive in DOM level 3).
target	EventTarget	Used to indicate the EventTarget to which the event was originally dispatched.
currentTarget	EventTarget	Used to indicate the EventTarget whose EventListeners are currently being processed.
eventPhase	unsigned short	Used to indicate which phase of event flow is currently being evaluated.
bubbles	boolean	Used to indicate whether or not an event is a bubbling event.
cancelable	boolean	Used to indicate whether or not an event can have its default action prevented.
timeStamp	DOMTimeStamp	Used to specify the time (in milliseconds relative to the epoch) at which the event was created.

Event methods
Name	Argument type	Argument name	Description
stopPropagation			To prevent further propagation of an event during event flow.
preventDefault			To cancel the event if it is cancelable, meaning that any default action normally taken by the implementation as a result of the event will not occur.
initEvent	DOMString	eventTypeArg	Specifies the event type.
initEvent	boolean	canBubbleArg	Specifies whether or not the event can bubble.
initEvent	boolean	cancelableArg	Specifies whether or not the event's default action can be prevented.

== Event handling models ==
=== DOM Level 0 ===
This event handling model was introduced by Netscape Navigator, and remains the most cross-browser model as of 2005. There are two model types: the inline model and the traditional model.

==== Inline model ====
In the inline model, event handlers are added as attributes of elements. In the example below, an alert dialog box with the message "Hey Joe" appears after the hyperlink is clicked. The default click action is cancelled by returning false in the event handler.

<!doctype html>
<html lang="en">
<head>
	<meta charset="utf-8">
	<title>Inline Event Handling</title>
</head>
<body>

	<h1>Inline Event Handling</h1>

	<p>Hey <a href="http://www.example.com" onclick="triggerAlert('Joe'); return false;">Joe</a>!</p>

	<script>
		function triggerAlert(name) {
			window.alert("Hey " + name);
		}
	</script>
</body>
</html>

One common misconception with the inline model is the belief that it allows the registration of event handlers with custom arguments, e.g. name in the triggerAlert function. While it may seem like that is the case in the example above, what is really happening is that the JavaScript engine of the browser creates an anonymous function containing the statements in the onclick attribute. The onclick handler of the element would be bound to the following anonymous function:

function () {
	triggerAlert('Joe');
	return false;
}

This limitation of the JavaScript event model is usually overcome by assigning attributes to the function object of the event handler or by using closures.

==== Traditional model ====
In the traditional model, event handlers can be added or removed by scripts. Like the inline model, each event can only have one event handler registered. The event is added by assigning the handler name to the event property of the element object. To remove an event handler, simply set the property to null:

<!doctype html>
<html lang="en">
<head>
	<meta charset="utf-8">
	<title>Traditional Event Handling</title>
</head>

<body>
	<h1>Traditional Event Handling</h1>
	
	<p>Hey Joe!</p>

	<script>
		var triggerAlert = function () {
			window.alert("Hey Joe");
		};
		
		// Assign an event handler
		document.onclick = triggerAlert;
		
		// Assign another event handler
		window.onload = triggerAlert;
		
		// Remove the event handler that was just assigned
		window.onload = null;
	</script>
</body>
</html>

To add parameters:

var name = 'Joe';
document.onclick = (function (name) {
	return function () {
		alert('Hey ' + name + '!');
	};
}(name));

Inner functions preserve their scope.

=== DOM Level 2 ===
The W3C designed a more flexible event handling model in DOM Level 2.

Name	Description	Argument type	Argument name
addEventListener	Allows the registration of event listeners on the event target.	DOMString	type
addEventListener	Allows the registration of event listeners on the event target.	EventListener	listener
addEventListener	Allows the registration of event listeners on the event target.	boolean	useCapture
removeEventListener	Allows the removal of event listeners from the event target.	DOMString	type
removeEventListener	Allows the removal of event listeners from the event target.	EventListener	listener
removeEventListener	Allows the removal of event listeners from the event target.	boolean	useCapture
dispatchEvent	Allows sending the event to the subscribed event listeners.	Event	evt

Some useful things to know :

- To prevent an event from bubbling, developers must call the stopPropagation() method of the event object.
- To prevent the default action of the event to be called, developers must call the preventDefault() method of the event object.

The main difference from the traditional model is that multiple event handlers can be registered for the same event. The useCapture option can also be used to specify that the handler should be called in the capture phase instead of the bubbling phase. This model is supported by Mozilla, Opera, Safari, Chrome and Konqueror.

==== A rewrite of the example used in the traditional model ====
<!doctype html>
<html lang="en">
<head>
     <meta charset="utf-8">
     <title>DOM Level 2</title>
</head>

<body>
     <h1>DOM Level 2</h1>
     
     <p>Hey Joe!</p>
     
     
     <script>
          var heyJoe = function () {
               window.alert("Hey Joe!");
          }
          
          // Add an event handler
          document.addEventListener( "click", heyJoe, true );  // capture phase
          
          // Add another event handler
          window.addEventListener( "load", heyJoe, false );  // bubbling phase
          
          // Remove the event handler just added
          window.removeEventListener( "load", heyJoe, false );
     </script>

</body>
</html>

=== Internet Explorer-specific model ===
Microsoft Internet Explorer prior to version 8 does not follow the W3C model, as its own model was created prior to the ratification of the W3C standard. Internet Explorer 9 follows DOM level 3 events, and Internet Explorer 11 deletes its support for Microsoft-specific model.

Name	Description	Argument type	Argument name
attachEvent	Similar to W3C's addEventListener method.	String	sEvent
attachEvent	Similar to W3C's addEventListener method.	Pointer	fpNotify
detachEvent	Similar to W3C's removeEventListener method.	String	sEvent
detachEvent	Similar to W3C's removeEventListener method.	Pointer	fpNotify
fireEvent	Similar to W3C's dispatchEvent method.	String	sEvent
fireEvent	Similar to W3C's dispatchEvent method.	Event	oEventObject

Some useful things to know :

- To prevent an event bubbling, developers must set the event's cancelBubble property.
- To prevent the default action of the event to be called, developers must set the event's returnValue property.
- The this keyword refers to the global window object.

Again, this model differs from the traditional model in that multiple event handlers can be registered for the same event. However the useCapture option can not be used to specify that the handler should be called in the capture phase. This model is supported by Microsoft Internet Explorer and Trident based browsers (e.g. Maxthon, Avant Browser).

==== A rewrite of the example used in the old Internet Explorer-specific model ====
<!doctype html>
<html lang="en">
<head>
     <meta charset="utf-8">
     <title>Internet Explorer-specific model</title>
</head>
<body>
     <h1>Internet Explorer-specific model</h1>

     <p>Hey Joe!</p>

     <script>
          var heyJoe = function () {
               window.alert("Hey Joe!");
          }
          
          // Add an event handler
          document.attachEvent("onclick", heyJoe);
          
          // Add another event handler
          window.attachEvent("onload", heyJoe);
          
          // Remove the event handler just added
          window.detachEvent("onload", heyJoe);
     </script>

</body>
</html>
