= Rochelle Lefkowitz =

American journalist

Rochelle Lefkowitz is president and founder of Pro-Media Communications, a bicoastal public interest public relations firm.

== Education ==
She holds a bachelor of arts degree from Cornell University in Latin American studies and a master of arts degree in education from Boston University.

== Overview ==
Lefkowitz co-edited the 1986 book For Crying Out Loud: Women and Poverty in the United States with Ann Withorn. Writers and activists that contributed to the book included Barbara Ehrenreich, Frances Fox Piven and Linda Burnham. In that same year, she founded Pro-Media Communications to help organizations, non-profits and individuals enact social change. Since its founding the organization has worked on a range of social issues, from the death penalty to poverty issues to gay rights.

Lefkowitz coined the term "Fuels from Heaven, Fuels from Hell," which was cited by Thomas Friedman in his book Hot, Flat, and Crowded. Lefkowitz is a featured blogger for the Huffington Post.

Prior to the founding of Pro-Media Communications, she was a human services reporter covering the Massachusetts State House.

== Activism ==
In 1977, Lefkowitz became an associate of the Women's Institute for Freedom of the Press (WIFP). WIFP is an American nonprofit publishing organization. The organization works to increase communication between women and connect the public with forms of women-based media.

== Personal life ==
Lefkowitz is married to Felix Kramer, promoter of plug-in hybrid electric vehicles.
