= Listen to Wikipedia =

Real-time visualization and sonification of Wikipedia activity

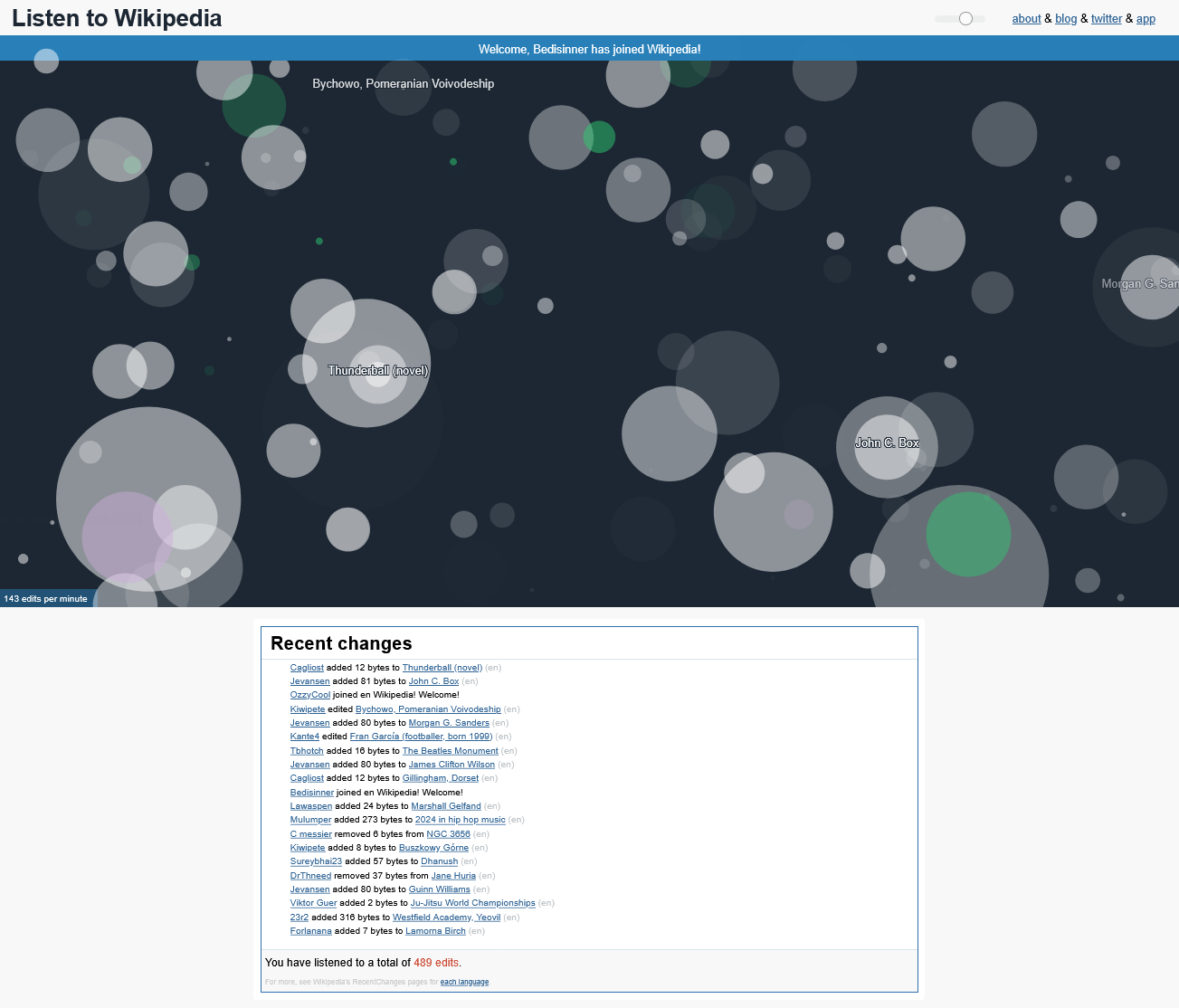
- Developers: Stephen LaPorte, Mahmoud Hashemi
- Written in: JavaScript and HTML
- License: 3-clause BSD license
- Website: listen.hatnote.com
- Repository: github.com/hatnote/listen-to-wikipedia/

Listen to Wikipedia is a multimedia visualizer developed by Mahmoud Hashemi and Stephen LaPorte which translates recent Wikipedia edits into a display of visuals and sounds. The open source software application creates a real-time statistical graphic with sound from contributions to Wikipedia from around the world. To accomplish this, L2W uses the graphics library D3.js.

The project won Silver in the Interactive Visualization category of the Kantar Information is Beautiful Awards in 2013. The concept of Listen to Wikipedia is based on BitListen, originally known as Listen to Bitcoin, by Maximillian Laumaister.

== Presentation ==
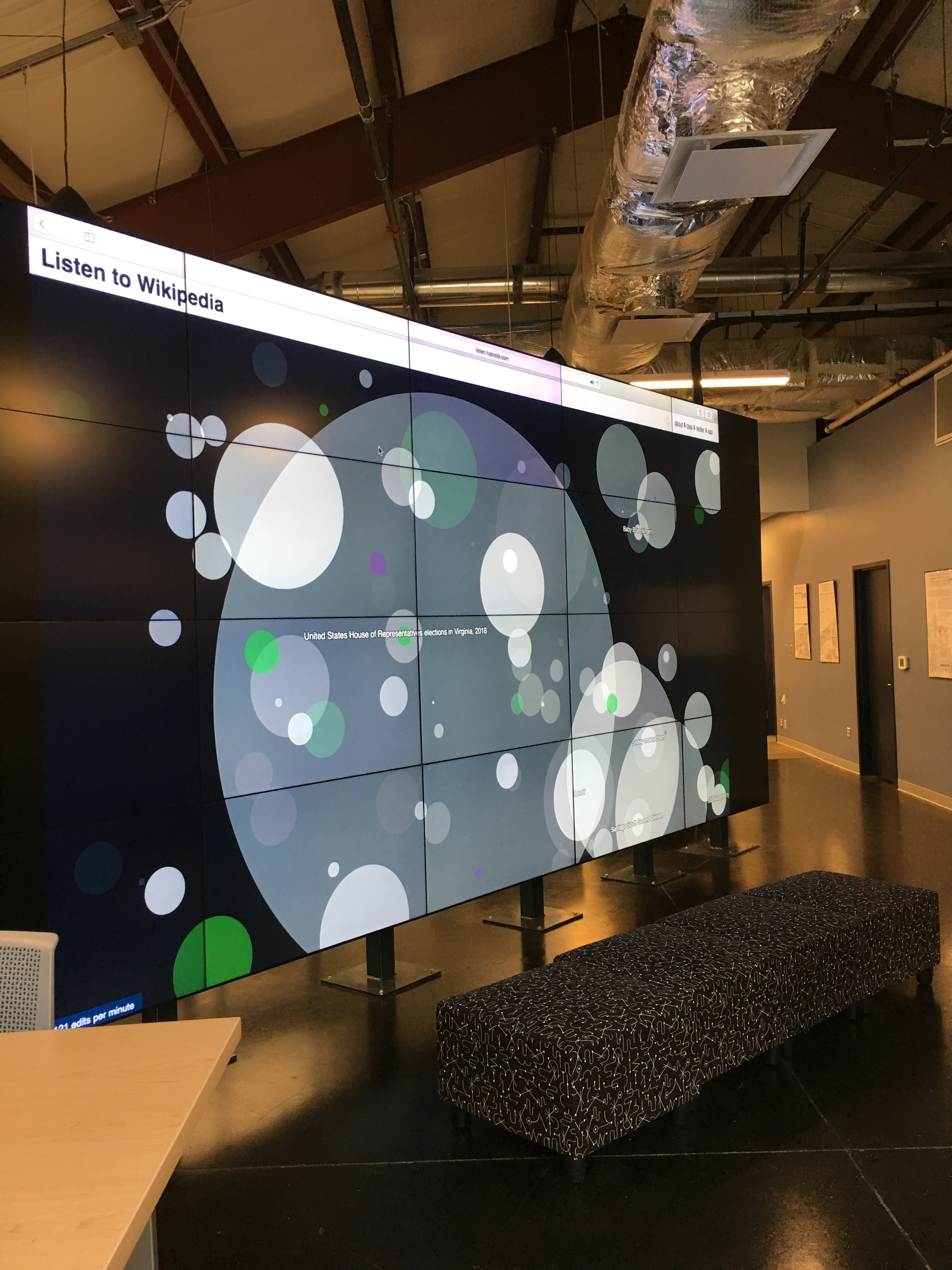
Listen to Wikipedia exhibited at the University of Virginia

=== Audio ===
Each edit produces a note in the pentatonic scale. The bell-like sounds of a celesta correspond to edits with a net addition of content to Wikipedia, and the strums of a clavichord correspond to net subtractions of content. The pitch is inversely proportional to the size of the edit (lower pitched notes are produced by larger edits). Newly registered Wikipedia users are welcomed by a string chord.

=== Visuals ===
Each edit creates a circle of one of three colors: white for registered users, green for unregistered users, and violet for Wikipedia bots. The size of a circle is proportional to the magnitude of change executed by the edit; larger circles are produced by larger edits. The name of the article edited is displayed in the center of the circle. Clicking on the text opens a Wikipedia page in a new tab in the user's browser, showing the revision. A blue bar at the top of the screen will appear whenever a new Wikipedia user is registered, listing their username. At the bottom left corner, there is a bar showing the number of edits per minute.
