= Glyph Lefkowitz =

American open-source software developer

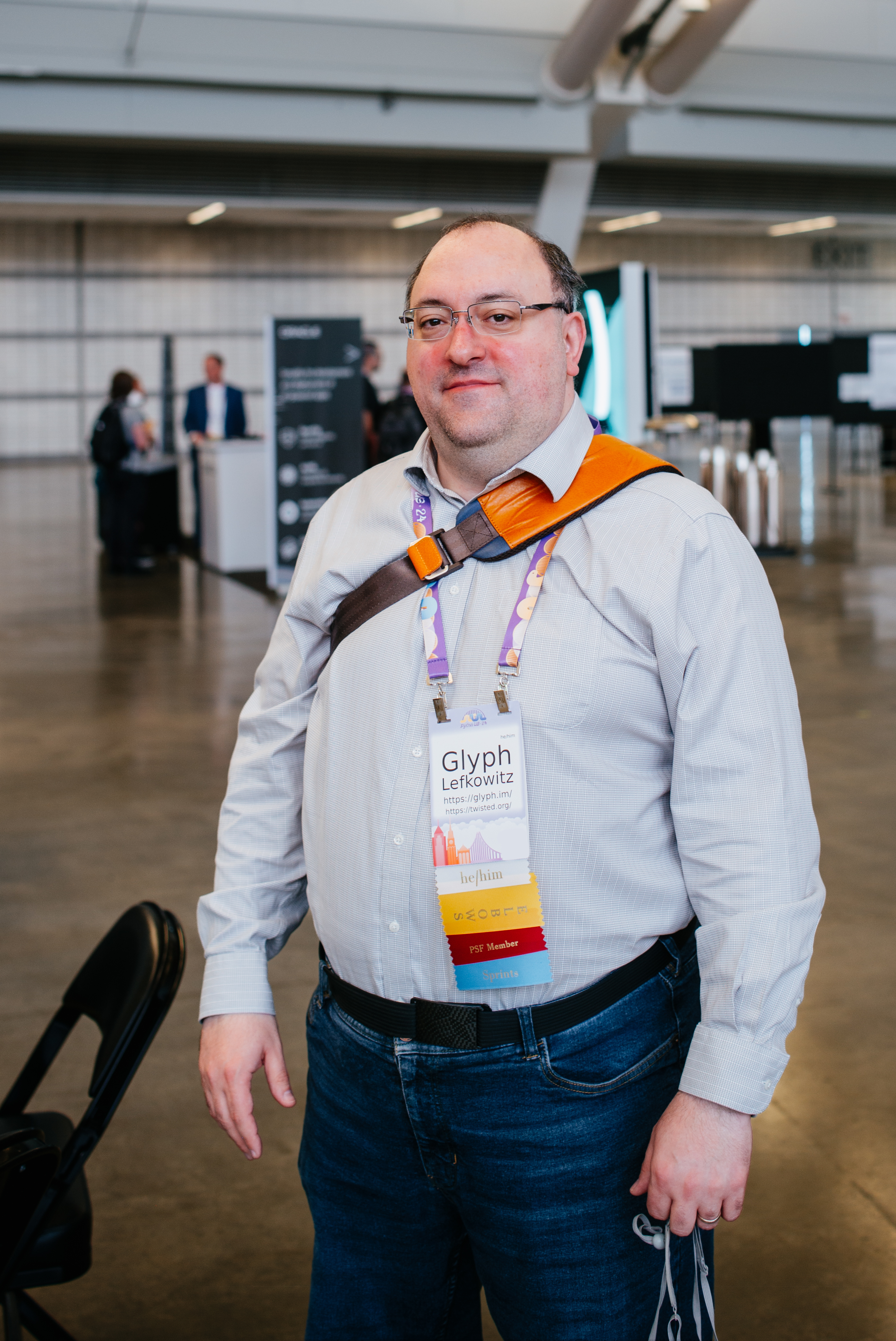
- Born: Matthew Lefkowitz
- Occupation: Programmer
- Known for: Twisted networking framework
- Website: glyph.twistedmatrix.com

Glyph Lefkowitz is an American open-source software programmer and creator of the Twisted network programming framework for Python. His work on asynchronous programming techniques influenced the core Python language, as well as the JavaScript Promises ecosystem, through Dojo and Mochikit.

He is a frequent speaker at developer conferences and was elected a fellow of the Python Software Foundation (PSF) in 2009.

Between 2009 and 2013, he was one of the primary contributors of Apple's Calendar and Contacts Server (CCS) software.

In 2017, the PSF awarded Lefkowitz their Community Service Award for his influence on the direction of the Python language and community, including his role in pioneering asynchronous programming models.
