= Wormhole physics =

Wormhole Physics may refer to:

- Wormhole, the scientific study of wormholes
- Wormhole physics (Stargate), the fictional laws that govern wormhole travel in Stargate
