= Tabbing navigation =

Ability to move through a document or form with the tab key

In computing, tabbing navigation is the ability to navigate between focusable elements (such as hyperlinks and form controls) within a structured document or user interface (such as HTML) with the tab key of a computer keyboard. Usually, pressing Tab will focus on the next element, while pressing Shift + Tab will focus on the previous element. The order of focusing can be determined implicitly (based on physical order) or explicitly (based on tab index). In general, tabbing is cyclical, not linear, meaning that the tabbing will cycle to the first/last element when it moves away from the last/first element.

== Tab order ==
The tab order of the graphical control elements on a form determines the sequence in which the focus will change when the user strikes the tab key. Usually the tab order is left to right within each row of controls.

Not all controls can receive the focus. In Java, labels can receive focus but in Visual Studio they cannot. Also, the TabStop property (in Visual Studio) can be set to false to prevent a control from receiving the focus.

== Customization ==
On web pages, by default, tabbing navigates through form fields (such as text entry) and anchors (such as links) in the order they appear in the character stream (i.e., in the raw HTML). This can be overridden by the page author using the tabindex attribute, or by disabling a form field.

At the client end, OS X defaults to only focusing text boxes and lists, but this setting can be overridden to allow navigation to all entries (see references). Mozilla Firefox can similarly be customized to include or exclude navigation to text areas, other form elements, and anchors.

== Alternatives ==
Most desktop applications and web browsers support this kind of keyboard navigation. But in some web browsers like Opera, an alternative method known as spatial navigation is used. This method, in many cases, avoids many key presses. In addition, Mozilla Application Suite and Mozilla Firefox support caret navigation, which provides a more natural way of document navigation similar to mouse navigation.

== See also ==
- Spatial navigation
- Caret navigation
