= Computer network programming =

Writing computer programs with networking capability

Computer network programming involves writing computer programs that enable processes to communicate with each other across a computer network.

== Connection-oriented and connectionless communications ==
Very generally, most of communications can be divided into connection-oriented, and connectionless. Whether a communication is connection-oriented or connectionless, is defined by the communication protocol, and not by application programming interface (API). Examples of the connection-oriented protocols include Transmission Control Protocol (TCP) and Sequenced Packet Exchange (SPX), and examples of connectionless protocols include User Datagram Protocol (UDP), "raw IP", and Internetwork Packet Exchange (IPX).

== Clients and servers ==
For connection-oriented communications, communication parties usually have different roles. One party is usually waiting for incoming connections; this party is usually referred to as "server". Another party is the one which initiates connection; this party is usually referred to as "client".

For connectionless communications, one party ("server") is usually waiting for an incoming packet, and another party ("client") is usually understood as the one which sends an unsolicited packet to "server".

== Popular protocols and APIs ==
Network programming traditionally covers different layers of OSI/ISO model (most of application-level programming belongs to L4 and up). The table below contains some examples of popular protocols belonging to different OSI/ISO layers, and popular APIs for them.

OSI/ISO Layer	Protocol	API
L3 (network)	IP	Raw socket
L4 (transport)	TCP, UDP, SCTP	Berkeley Sockets
L5 (session)	TLS	OpenSSL
L7 (application)	HTTP	Various

== See also ==
- Software-defined networking
- Infrastructure as code
- Site reliability engineering
- DevOps
