= Evil maid attack =

Type of computer security breach

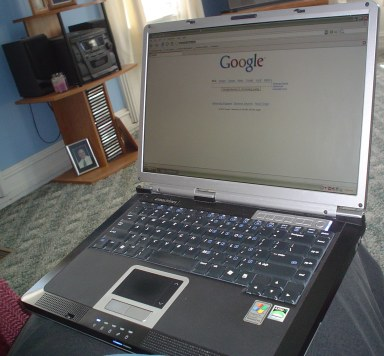
Any unattended device, like the laptop depicted, is at risk of an evil maid attack

An evil maid attack is a class of cyberattacks on an unattended device, in which an attacker with physical access alters it in some undetectable way so that they can later access the device, or the data on it.

In particular, the attack could bypass system passwords and even disk encryption measures in use at the time, and further security mechanisms such as secure boot were needed to mitigate it.

The name refers to the threat scenario where a maid could subvert a device left unattended in a hotel room. However, the term broadly applies to any situation where an adversary has physical access to an unattended device.

== Overview ==
=== Origin ===
In a 2009 blog post, security analyst Joanna Rutkowska coined the term "Evil Maid Attack" due to hotel rooms being a common place where devices are left unattended. Rutkowska then published a practical method for bypassing TrueCrypt disk encryption on victim devices, requiring merely an external USB flash drive.

D. Defreez, a computer security professional, first mentioned the possibility of an evil maid attack on Android smartphones in 2011. He talked about the WhisperCore Android distribution and its ability to provide disk encryption for Androids.

=== Notable instances ===
In 2007, former U.S. Commerce Secretary Carlos Gutierrez was allegedly targeted by an evil maid attack during a business trip to China. He left his computer unattended during a trade talk in Beijing, and he suspected that his device had been compromised. Although the allegations have yet to be confirmed or denied, the incident caused the U.S. government to be more wary of physical attacks.

In 2009, Symantec CTO Mark Bregman was advised by several U.S. agencies to leave his devices in the U.S. before travelling to China. He was instructed to buy new ones before leaving and dispose of them when he returned so that any physical attempts to retrieve data would be ineffective.

== Methods of attack ==
=== Classic evil maid ===
The attack begins when the victim leaves their device unattended. If the victim's device has disk encryption, the attacker cannot access or tamper with the data directly. However, some part of the disk needs to be left unencrypted, such as the MBR and bootloader; the attacker can replace this with a malicious bootloader that waits for the victim to return and enter their encryption password. The malicious software can then record the password for the attacker to retrieve later, or transmit it over the network.

Some devices are also vulnerable to a DMA attack in which an attacker accesses the victim's information through hardware ports that can directly access the device's memory.

=== Network evil maid ===
An evil maid attack can also be done by replacing the victim's device with an identical device. If the original device has a bootloader password, then the attacker only needs to acquire a device with an identical bootloader password input screen. If the device has a lock screen, however, the process becomes more difficult as the attacker must acquire the background picture to put on the lock screen of the mimicking device. In either case, when the victim inputs their password on the false device, the device sends the password to the attacker, who is in possession of the original device. The attacker can then access the victim's data.

== Vulnerable interfaces ==
=== Legacy BIOS ===
Legacy BIOS is considered insecure against evil maid attacks. Its architecture is old, updates and Option ROMs are unsigned, and configuration is unprotected. Additionally, it does not support secure boot. These vulnerabilities allow an attacker to boot from an external drive and compromise the firmware. The compromised firmware can then be configured to send keystrokes to the attacker remotely.

=== Unified Extensible Firmware Interface ===
Unified Extensible Firmware Interface (UEFI) specifies many security features that, in combination, can mitigate evil maid attacks. For example, it offers a framework for secure boot, authenticated variables at boot-time, and TPM initialization security. However, these features are not effective if device manufacturers do not implement them correctly. For example, some ASUS UEFI firmware were found to be vulnerable in 2013.

=== Full disk encryption systems ===
Many full disk encryption systems, such as TrueCrypt and PGP Whole Disk Encryption, are susceptible to evil maid attacks due to their inability to authenticate themselves to the user. An attacker can still modify disk contents despite the device being powered off and encrypted. The attacker can modify the encryption system's loader codes to steal passwords from the victim.

The ability to create a communication channel between the bootloader and the operating system to remotely steal the password for a disk protected by FileVault 2, is also explored. On a macOS system, this attack has additional implications due to "password forwarding" technology, in which a user's account password also serves as the FileVault password, enabling an additional attack surface through privilege escalation.

=== Thunderbolt ===
In 2019 a vulnerability named "Thunderclap" in Intel Thunderbolt ports found on many PCs was announced which could allow a rogue actor to gain access to the system via direct memory access (DMA). This is possible despite use of an input/output memory management unit (IOMMU). This vulnerability was largely patched by vendors. This was followed in 2020 by "Thunderspy" which is believed to be unpatchable and allows similar exploitation of DMA to gain total access to the system bypassing all security features.

=== Mass-produced devices ===
Mass-produced devices such as smartphones are especially vulnerable to a network evil maid attack. If the attacker knows which model the victim uses, they can replace the victim's device with an identical-looking model with a password-stealing mechanism.

== Mitigation ==
=== Detection ===
One approach is to detect that someone is close to, or handling the unattended device. Vacuum packing, proximity alarms, motion detector alarms, and wireless cameras, can be used to alert the victim when an attacker is nearby their device, thereby nullifying the surprise factor of an evil maid attack. The Haven Android app was created in 2017 by Edward Snowden to do such monitoring, and transmit the results to the user's smartphone.

In the absence of the above, tamper-evident technology of various kinds can be used to detect whether the device has been taken apart – including the low-cost solution of putting glitter nail polish over the screw holes.

After an attack has been suspected, the victim can have their device checked to see if any malware was installed, but this is challenging. Suggested approaches are checking the hashes of selected disk sectors and partitions.

=== Prevention ===
If the device is under surveillance at all times, an attacker cannot perform an evil maid attack without detection. If left unattended, the device may also be placed inside a lockbox so that an attacker will not have physical access to it. However, there will be situations, such as a device being taken away temporarily by airport or law enforcement personnel where this is not practical.

Basic security measures such as having the latest up-to-date firmware and shutting down the device before leaving it unattended prevent an attack from exploiting vulnerabilities in legacy architecture and allowing external devices into open ports, respectively.

CPU-based disk encryption systems, such as TRESOR and Loop-Amnesia, prevent data from being vulnerable to a DMA attack by ensuring it does not leak into system memory.

TPM-based secure boot has been shown to mitigate (not prevent) a class of evil maid attacks by authenticating the device to the user. It does this by unlocking itself only if the correct password is given by the user and if it measures that no unauthorized code has been executed on the device. These measurements are done by root of trust systems, such as Microsoft's BitLocker and Intel's TXT technology. The Anti Evil Maid program builds upon TPM-based secure boot and further attempts to authenticate the device to the user.

== See also ==
- Cold boot attack
- Shoulder surfing (computer security)
