= Pre-boot authentication =

Extension of the BIOS or boot firmware

Pre-boot authentication (PBA) or power-on authentication (POA) serves as an extension of the BIOS, UEFI or boot firmware and guarantees a secure, tamper-proof environment external to the operating system as a trusted authentication layer. The PBA prevents anything being read from the hard disk such as the operating system until the user has confirmed they have the correct password or other credentials including multi-factor authentication.

== Uses of pre-boot authentication ==
- Full disk encryption outside of the operating system level
- Encryption of temporary files
- Data at rest protection
- Encryption of cloud servers or instances

== Pre-boot authentication process ==
A PBA environment serves as an extension of the BIOS, UEFI or boot firmware and guarantees a secure, tamper-proof environment external to the operating system as a trusted authentication layer. The PBA prevents any operating system from loading until the user has confirmed he/she has the correct password to unlock the computer. That trusted layer eliminates the possibility that one of the millions of lines of OS code can compromise the privacy of personal or company data.

=== Generic boot sequence ===
in BIOS mode:

1. Basic Input/Output System (BIOS)
2. Master boot record (MBR) partition table
3. Pre-boot authentication (PBA)
4. Operating system (OS) boots

in UEFI mode:

1. UEFI (Unified Extensible Firmware Interface)
2. GUID Partition Table (GPT)
3. Pre-boot authentication (PBA)
4. Operating system (OS) boots

== Pre-boot authentication technologies ==
=== Combinations with full disk encryption ===
Pre-boot authentication can by performed by an add-on of the operating system like Linux Initial ramdisk or Microsoft's boot software of the system partition (or boot partition) or by a variety of full disk encryption (FDE) vendors that can be installed separately to the operating system. Legacy FDE systems tended to rely upon PBA as their primary control. These systems have been replaced by systems using hardware-based dual-factor systems like TPM chips or other proven cryptographic approaches. However, without any form of authentication (e.g. a fully transparent authentication loading hidden keys), encryption provides little protection from advanced attackers as this authentication-less encryption fully rely on the post-boot authentication comes from Active Directory authentication at the GINA step of Windows.

=== Security concerns ===
Microsoft released BitLocker Countermeasures defining protection schemes for Windows. For mobile devices that can be stolen and attackers gain permanent physical access (paragraph Attacker with skill and lengthy physical access) Microsoft advise the use of pre-boot authentication and to disable standby power management. Pre-boot authentication can be performed with TPM with PIN protector or any 3rd party FDA vendor.

Best security is offered by offloading the cryptographic encryption keys from the protected client and supplying key material externally within the user authentication process. This method eliminates attacks on any built-in authentication method that are weaker than a brute-force attack to the symmetric AES keys used for full disk encryption.

Without cryptographic protection of a hardware (TPM) supported secure boot environment, PBA is easily defeated with Evil Maid style of attacks. However, with modern hardware (including TPM or cryptographic multi-factor authentication) most FDE solutions are able to ensure that removal of hardware for brute-force attacks is no longer possible.

== Authentication methods ==
The standard complement of authentication methods exist for pre-boot authentication including:

1. Something you know (e.g. username/password like Active Directory credentials or TPM pin)
2. Something you have (e.g. smart card or other token)
3. Something you are (e.g. biometric attributes like fingerprint, face recognition, iris scan)
4. Automatic authentication in trusted zones (e.g. boot key provided to company devices by the enterprise network)
