= Encrypted filesystem =

Encrypted filesystem may refer to:

- Filesystem-level encryption, a form of disk encryption where individual files or directories are encrypted by the file system itself
- Encrypting File System, the Microsoft Windows encryption subsystem of NTFS

== See also ==
- Disk encryption, which uses encrypts every bit of data that goes on a disk or disk volume
- Disk encryption hardware
- Disk encryption software
- Hardware-based full disk encryption
