= Raheem Beyah =

American computer engineer (born 1976)

- Born: December 23, 1976 (age 49)
- Education: North Carolina A&T State University (BS); Georgia Institute of Technology (MS, PhD)
- Title: Provost and Executive Vice President of Academic Affairs
- Scientific career
- Fields: Computer engineering
- Institutions: Georgia Institute of Technology; Georgia State University
- Thesis: "A Deployable Approach to Better Than Best Effort Quality of Service"
- Doctoral advisor: John A. Copeland; Raghupathy Sivakumar
- Website: Bayeh at Georgia Tech

Raheem Beyah (born December 23, 1976) is an American computer engineer, researcher, and educator. As of November 1, 2025, he is the Provost and Executive Vice President of Academic Affairs of the Georgia Institute of Technology. Prior to becoming the provost, he was the Dean of the College of Engineering and Southern Company Chair at the Georgia Institute of Technology. Prior to becoming the dean, he was the vice president for interdisciplinary research and the Motorola Foundation Professor and the executive director of Georgia Tech's online masters in cyber security (OMS Cyber) program. Beyah is also the co-founder and chair of industrial security company Fortiphyd Logic, Inc.

== Early life and education ==
Beyah was drawn to the field of computer engineering through video games. He attended the Atlanta Public Schools System and graduated from Frederick Douglass High School. He received his B.S. in electrical engineering from North Carolina A&T State University in 1998 and his M.S. and Ph.D. in electrical and computer engineering from Georgia Tech in 1999 and 2003, respectively. His thesis, "A Deployable Approach to Better Than Best Effort Quality of Service", was advised by John A. Copeland and Raghupathy Sivakumar.

== Career ==
Beyah began his career working at Accenture (formerly Andersen Consulting). After being promoted to the level of Consultant, Beyah left and returned to Georgia Tech to pursue a Ph.D. in electrical and computer engineering, advised by Copeland. While completing his Ph.D., he worked as a research engineer at Georgia Tech. In 2005 he joined the computer science department at Georgia State University as an assistant professor while maintaining an adjunct professor appointment at Georgia Tech. In 2011, he returned to Georgia Tech full time as an associate professor in the School of Electrical and Computer Engineering.

Beyah's research interests are in the areas of network security and monitoring, cyber-physical systems security, network traffic characterization and performance, and critical infrastructure security. His works have been frequently cited. Beyah serves as the director of the Communications Assurance and Performance (CAP) research group. Through this group he has discovered several flaws in critical infrastructure components. His work has been highlighted in Forbes, USA Today, DARKReading, WIRED Magazine and NETWORKWORLD. In 2017, Beyah and his students introduced a proof of concept of LogicLocker, the first ransomware for programmable logic controllers.

Beyah was promoted to professor, appointed to the Motorola Foundation Endowed Professorship, and appointed as associate chair for strategic initiatives and innovation in 2016. He served as interim Steve W. Chaddick School Chair for the 2017-2018 academic year. Upon stepping down, he was appointed as the executive director for Georgia Tech's Online Masters in Cybersecurity (OMS Cyber) program. In 2019, he became Georgia Tech's vice president for interdisciplinary research and was later asked to lead the institute's data security efforts by Georgia Tech President Ángel Cabrera. In 2021, he became the dean of the College of Engineering and the Southern Company Chair. In 2025, he became Georgia Tech’s Provost and Executive Vice President of Academic Affairs.

In addition to his work in the academy, Beyah has served as a witness for court cases, including a whistleblower case against Davita Health Care Providers on which he served as a software expert for the plaintiff. Davita Health Care Providers settled the lawsuit for $495M. In 2016, Beyah co-founded Fortiphyd Logic, Inc. and he currently chairs the Board of Directors.

== Honors and awards ==
- National Science Foundation (NSF) Faculty Early Career Development (CAREER) Award (2009-2014)
- Defense Advanced Research Projects Agency (DARPA) Computer Science Study Panel (2010)
- Minority in Research Science Trailblazer, National Black Engineer of the Year Awards (BEYA) (2010)
- Motorola Foundation Professorship, School of Electrical and Computer Engineering, Georgia Tech (2016)
- Distinguished Member, Association for Computing Machinery (ACM) (2016)
- Best Paper Award (3rd place) at the NYU Cyber Security Awareness Week (CSAW) Security Research Competition, 2016
- Diverse Issues in Higher Education, Emerging Scholar (2017)
- North Carolina A&T College of Engineering Alumni Achievement Award (2024)
- ACM Conference on Computer and Communications Security (CCS) Distinguished Paper Award (2024)
- Fellow, Institute of Electrical and Electronics Engineers (IEEE) (2024)
- Fellow, American Association for the Advancement of Science (AAAS) (2025)

== Selected publications ==
- Beyah, R.; Kangude, S.; Strickland, B.; Copeland, J. (2004). "Rogue access point detection using temporal traffic characteristics". IEEE Global Telecommunications Conference, 2004. GLOBECOM '04. Vol. 4. pp. 2271–2275. doi:10.1109/GLOCOM.2004.1378413. ISBN 0-7803-8794-5. S2CID 10272290.
- Ji, Shouling; Li, Weiqing; Srivatsa, Mudhakar; Beyah, Raheem (November 3, 2014). "Structural Data De-anonymization: Quantification, Practice, and Implications". Proceedings of the 2014 ACM SIGSAC Conference on Computer and Communications Security. pp. 1040–1053. doi:10.1145/2660267.2660278. ISBN 9781450329576. S2CID 16403005.
- Vu, C. T.; Beyah, R. A.; Li, Y. (April 2007). "Composite Event Detection in Wireless Sensor Networks". 2007 IEEE International Performance, Computing, and Communications Conference. pp. 264–271. doi:10.1109/PCCC.2007.358903. ISBN 978-1-4244-1137-5. S2CID 821282.

== Patents ==
- Systems and methods for fingerprinting physical devices and device types based on network traffic
- Systems and methods for detection of infected websites
- Systems and methods for detecting anomalous software on a programmable logic controller
- Device fingerprinting for cyber-physical systems
- System for detecting malicious programmable logic controller code
