= Modern Standby =

Windows specification for power management

Modern Standby known formerly as Connected Standby or InstantGo, is a Microsoft specification for Windows 8 (and later) hardware and software that aims to bring smartphone-type power management capabilities to the PC platform, as well as increasing physical security.

== Description ==
The specification describes a Microsoft proprietary standard for Windows 8 software and hardware that developers and hardware vendors can optionally comply with to enable devices to be turned on and off instantly. It also allows the operating system to continue performing background tasks, such as updating content from apps, when a device is not being used. Devices must be able to turn on in less than 500 milliseconds. The hardware requirements extend to battery life, in that systems must not drain more than 5% of battery capacity while idle over a 16-hour period.

It requires the following:

- A firmware flag indicating support for the standard
- The boot volume must not use a hard disk drive
- Support for NDIS 6.30 by all network devices
- Passive cooling on standby
- Trusted Platform Module 2.0
- CPU, chipset and BIOS support for S0ix "Low Power S0 Idle" power state
- All peripheral devices and drivers must support D3cold

On Windows 8.1, supporting InstantGo and having a Trusted Platform Module (TPM) 2.0 chip will allow the device to use a passive device encryption system.

Compliant platforms also enables full BitLocker Device encryption. A background service that encrypts the whole system which can be found in 'Windows Security'>'Device Encryption' page in Windows 10 and 11.

Also Connected Standby or Modern Standby is mandatory for Windows Phone 8, Windows Phone 8.1 and Windows 10 Mobile.

== Limitations ==
Systems that support this specification are incapable of booting legacy BIOS operating systems. PCs with Modern Standby also cannot manually enter the Sleep power state and OEMs will often block S3 power state at the firmware level. In addition to that, Power Options from Control Panel have less advanced power plan settings.

== Issues ==
Microsoft's Modern Standby has experienced bugs that cause battery drain issues while the laptop is supposedly suspended. This has prevented some reviewers from recommending Windows laptops.

== See also ==
- Advanced Configuration and Power Interface (ACPI)
- Always On, Always Connected
- Trusted Computing Group (TCG)
- Unified Extensible Firmware Interface (UEFI)
