= Eeg (disambiguation) =

Electroencephalography (EEG) is a method to record an electrogram of the spontaneous electrical activity in the brain.

Eeg or EEG may also refer to:

== People ==
- Harald Rosenløw Eeg (born 1970), Norwegian writer
- Sinne Eeg (born 1977), Danish musician
- Syvert Omundsen Eeg (1757–1838), Norwegian politician

== Other uses ==
- Eastern European Group, in the United Nations
- Emirates Environmental Group
- Enterprise encryption gateway
- Emperor Entertainment Group, a Hong Kong–based entertainment company of Emperor Group
- Esto es guerra, a Peruvian TV reality show
- German Renewable Energy Sources Act (German: Erneuerbare Energien Gesetz), of the Government of Germany
