= Psid =

PSID or Psid may refer to:

== Science and technology ==
- Pounds per square inch differential, a unit of measurement
- PSID, a standard for MOS Technology SID music files
- Provider Service Identifier, in the family of Wireless Access in Vehicular Environments standards
- Physical Security ID, an ID present on all Self-encrypting drives

== Other uses ==
- Panel Study of Income Dynamics, a long term survey of a set of households in the US
