= Thunderspy =

Security vulnerability

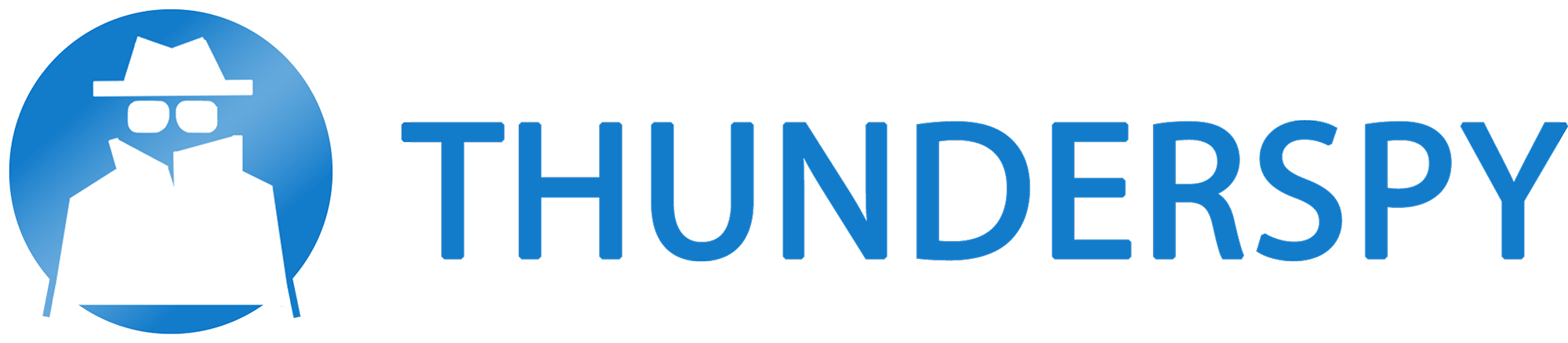
- A logo created for the vulnerability, featuring an image of a spy
- Date discovered: May 2020; 6 years ago
- Date patched: 2019 via Kernel DMA Protection
- Discoverer: Björn Ruytenberg
- Affected hardware: Computers manufactured before 2019, and some after that, having the Intel Thunderbolt 3 (and below) port.
- Website: thunderspy.io

Thunderspy is a type of security vulnerability, based on the Intel Thunderbolt 3 port, first reported publicly on 10 May 2020, that can result in an evil maid (i.e., attacker of an unattended device) attack gaining full access to a computer's information in about five minutes, and may affect millions of Apple, Linux and Windows computers, as well as any computers manufactured before 2019, and some after that.

According to Björn Ruytenberg, the discoverer of the vulnerability, "All the evil maid needs to do is unscrew the backplate, attach a device momentarily, reprogram the firmware, reattach the backplate, and the evil maid gets full access to the laptop. All of this can be done in under five minutes." The malicious firmware is used to clone device identities which makes classical DMA attack possible.

== History ==
The Thunderspy security vulnerabilities were first publicly reported by Björn Ruytenberg of Eindhoven University of Technology in the Netherlands on 10 May 2020. Thunderspy is similar to Thunderclap, another security vulnerability, reported in 2019, that also involves access to computer files through the Thunderbolt port.

== Impact ==
The security vulnerability affects millions of Apple, Linux and Windows computers, as well as all computers manufactured before 2019, and some after that. However, this impact is restricted mainly to how precise a bad actor would have to be to execute the attack. Physical access to a machine with a vulnerable Thunderbolt controller is necessary, as well as a writable ROM chip for the Thunderbolt controller's firmware. Additionally, part of Thunderspy, specifically the portion involving re-writing the firmware of the controller, requires the device to be in sleep, or at least in some sort of powered-on state, to be effective. Machines that force power-off when the case is open may assist in resisting this attack to the extent that the feature (switch) itself resists tampering.

Due to the nature of attacks that require extended physical access to hardware, it's unlikely the attack will affect users outside of a business or government environment.

== Mitigation ==
The researchers claim there is no easy software solution, and may only be mitigated by disabling the Thunderbolt port altogether. However, the impacts of this attack (reading kernel level memory without the machine needing to be powered off) are largely mitigated by anti-intrusion features provided by many business machines. Intel claims enabling such features would substantially restrict the effectiveness of the attack. Microsoft's official security recommendations recommend disabling sleep mode while using BitLocker. Using hibernation in place of sleep mode turns the device off, mitigating potential risks of attack on encrypted data.
