= Hardware-based full disk encryption =

Cryptographic hardware

Hardware-based full disk encryption (FDE) is available from many hard disk drive (HDD/SSD) vendors, including Kingston Technology, Integral Memory, iStorage Limited, Micron, Seagate Technology, Sandisk, Samsung, Toshiba, Viasat UK, and Western Digital. The symmetric encryption key is maintained independently from the computer's CPU, thus allowing the complete data store to be encrypted and removing computer memory as a potential attack vector. In memory controllers, hardware-based disk encryption is typically defined by cryptographic standards and implemented using block ciphers that operate in various chaining modes optimized for data sectors. To maximize cryptographic throughput and enhance cryptographic strength, hardware storage controllers may employ pipelined block cipher architectures that support multiple modes of operation simultaneously. This modular architecture makes it possible to support various cryptographic modes and key management functions directly at the hardware level, eliminating the need to rely on software (firmware) to implement cryptographic functions.

Hardware-FDE has two major components: the hardware encryptor and the data store. There are currently multiple varieties of hardware-FDE in common use:

1. Hard disk drive (HDD) or solid-state drive (SSD) FDE (self-encrypting drive)
2. Enclosed hard disk drive FDE
3. Removable hard disk drive FDE
4. Bridge and Chipset (BC) FDE

Hardware designed for a particular purpose can often achieve better performance than disk encryption software, and disk encryption hardware can be made more transparent to software than encryption done in software. As soon as the key has been initialised, the hardware should in principle be completely transparent to the OS and thus work with any OS. If the disk encryption hardware is integrated with the media itself the media may be designed for better integration. One example of such design would be through the use of physical sectors slightly larger than the logical sectors.

== Hardware-based full disk encryption types ==
=== Hard disk drive or solid-state drive FDE ===
Usually referred to as self-encrypting drive (SED). HDD or SSD FDE is made by HDD or SSD vendors using the OPAL and Enterprise standards developed by the Trusted Computing Group. Key management takes place within the hard disk controller and encryption keys are 128 or 256 bit Advanced Encryption Standard (AES) keys. Authentication on power up of the drive must still take place within the CPU via either a software pre-boot authentication environment (i.e., with a software-based full disk encryption component - hybrid full disk encryption) or with a BIOS password. In additions, some SEDs support IEEE 1667 standard.

Hitachi, Micron, Seagate, Samsung, and Toshiba are the disk drive manufacturers offering Trusted Computing Group Opal Storage Specification Serial ATA drives. HDDs have become a commodity so SED allow drive manufacturers to maintain revenue. Older technologies include the proprietary Seagate DriveTrust, and the older, and less secure, PATA Security command standard shipped by all drive makers including Western Digital. Enterprise SAS versions of the TCG standard are called "TCG Enterprise" drives.

=== Enclosed hard disk drive FDE ===
Within a standard hard drive form factor case the encryptor (BC), key store and a smaller form factor, commercially available, hard disk drive is enclosed.

- The enclosed hard disk drive's case can be tamper-evident, so when inspected the user can be assured that the data has not been compromised.
- The encryptors electronics including the key store and integral hard drive (if it is solid-state) can be protected by other tamper respondent measures.
- The key can be purged, allowing a user to prevent their authentication parameters being used without destroying the encrypted data. Later the same key can be re-loaded into the Enclosed hard disk drive FDE, to retrieve this data.
- Tampering is not an issue for SEDs as they cannot be read without the decryption key, regardless of access to the internal electronics.

Examples include Viasat UK (formerly Stonewood Electronics) with their FlagStone, Eclypt and DARC-ssd drives or GuardDisk with an RFID token.

=== Removable hard drive FDE ===
The inserted hard drive FDE allows a standard form factor hard disk drive to be inserted into it. The concept can be seen on

- This is an improvement on removing [unencrypted] hard drives from a computer and storing them in a safe when not in use.
- This design can be used to encrypt multiple drives using the same key.
- Generally they are not securely locked so the drive's interface is open to attack.

=== Chipset FDE ===
The encryptor bridge and chipset (BC) is placed between the computer and the standard hard disk drive, encrypting every sector written to it.

Intel announced the release of the Danbury chipset but has since abandoned this approach.

== Characteristics ==
Hardware-based encryption when built into the drive or within the drive enclosure is notably transparent to the user. The drive, except for bootup authentication, operates just like any drive, with no degradation in performance. There is no complication or performance overhead, unlike disk encryption software, since all the encryption is invisible to the operating system and the host computer's processor.

The two main use cases are Data at rest protection, and Cryptographic Disk Erasure.

For Data at rest protection a computer or laptop is simply powered off. The disk now self-protects all the data on it. The data is safe because all of it, even the OS, is now encrypted, with a secure mode of AES, and locked from reading and writing. The drive requires an authentication code which can be as strong as 32 bytes (256 bits) to unlock.

=== Disk sanitisation ===
Crypto-shredding is the practice of 'deleting' data by (only) deleting or overwriting the encryption keys. When a cryptographic disk erasure (or crypto erase) command is given (with proper authentication credentials), the drive self-generates a new media encryption key and goes into a 'new drive' state. Without the old key, the old data becomes irretrievable and therefore an efficient means of providing disk sanitisation which can be a lengthy (and costly) process. For example, an unencrypted and unclassified computer hard drive that requires sanitising to conform with Department of Defense Standards must be overwritten 3+ times; a one Terabyte Enterprise SATA3 disk would take many hours to complete this process. Although the use of faster solid-state drives (SSD) technologies improves this situation, the take up by enterprise has so far been slow. The problem will worsen as disk sizes increase every year. With encrypted drives a complete and secure data erasure action takes just a few milliseconds with a simple key change, so a drive can be safely repurposed very quickly. This sanitisation activity is protected in SEDs by the drive's own key management system built into the firmware in order to prevent accidental data erasure with confirmation passwords and secure authentications related to the original key required.

When keys are self-generated randomly, generally there is no method to store a copy to allow data recovery. In this case protecting this data from accidental loss or theft is achieved through a consistent and comprehensive data backup policy. The other method is for user-defined keys, for some Enclosed hard disk drive FDE, to be generated externally and then loaded into the FDE.

=== Protection from alternative boot methods ===
Recent hardware models circumvents booting from other devices and allowing access by using a dual Master Boot Record (MBR) system whereby the MBR for the operating system and data files is all encrypted along with a special MBR which is required to boot the operating system. In SEDs, all data requests are intercepted by their firmware, that does not allow decryption to take place unless the system has been booted from the special SED operating system which then loads the MBR of the encrypted part of the drive. This works by having a separate partition, hidden from view, which contains the proprietary operating system for the encryption management system. This means no other boot methods will allow access to the drive.

=== Vulnerabilities ===
Typically FDE, once unlocked, will remain unlocked as long as power is provided. Researchers at Universität Erlangen-Nürnberg have demonstrated a number of attacks based on moving the drive to another computer without cutting power. Additionally, it may be possible to reboot the computer into an attacker-controlled operating system without cutting power to the drive.

When a computer with a self-encrypting drive is put into sleep mode, the drive is powered down, but the encryption password is retained in memory so that the drive can be quickly resumed without requesting the password. An attacker can take advantage of this to gain easier physical access to the drive, for instance, by inserting extension cables.

The firmware of the drive may be compromised and so any data that is sent to it may be at risk. Even if the data is encrypted on the physical medium of the drive, the fact that the firmware is controlled by a malicious third-party means that it can be decrypted by that third-party. If data is encrypted by the operating system, and it is sent in a scrambled form to the drive, then it would not matter if the firmware is malicious or not.

=== Criticism ===
Hardware solutions have gained criticism for being poorly documented. Many aspects of how the encryption is done are not published by the vendor. This leaves the user with little possibility to judge the security of the product and potential attack methods. It also increases the risk of a vendor lock-in.

In addition, implementing system wide hardware-based full disk encryption is prohibitive for many companies due to the high cost of replacing existing hardware. This makes migrating to hardware encryption technologies more difficult and would generally require a clear migration and central management solution for both hardware- and software-based full disk encryption solutions. however Enclosed hard disk drive FDE and Removable Hard Drive FDE are often installed on a single drive basis.

== See also ==
- Disk encryption software
- Crypto-shredding
- Opal Storage Specification
- Yubikey
- Full disk encryption
- IBM Secure Blue
