= Getac Z710 =

Rugged tablet computer

- Manufacturer: Getac
- Type: Tablet computer
- Released: September 4, 2012
- Lifespan: 2012–present
- Operating system: Android 2.3 "Gingerbread" (upgradable to Android 4.1 "Jelly Bean")
- Website: us.getac.com/tablets/Z710/features.html

The Getac Z710 is a rugged tablet computer. It was introduced by Getac on September 4, 2012, when it was announced as the world's first rugged 7-inch Android tablet, and later as the world’s first rugged Android tablet to offer the option for the ATEX Zone II/22 certification for use in potentially explosive atmospheres, which is essential for many oil and gas uses as well as pharmaceutical manufacturing environments.

== Features ==
The tablet has a 7" Gorilla Glass touchscreen, a soft plastic outer shell, 7-inch LCD screen and weighs under 2 pounds. It is fully waterproof, and can operate in subzero temperatures. It also has an optional bar-code scanner and radio-frequency identification reader. Intended for use in utility industry markets, it is designed to allow for operation with gloved hands.

The product was originally released with Android 2.3 installed and was updated to Android 4.1 on April 16, 2013.

== Reviews ==
Inc. magazine rated the Z710 one of the four most durable tablets available, and the best tablet for extreme conditions. A report on Pocket-lint noted that the Z710 is less "silky smooth to look at" than the Nexus 7, but is likely to be more durable. Rugged PC Reviews said it "combines contemporary looks with the practicality and common sense design of a tool for the job."
