= IBM Secure Blue =

Secure Blue is a type of computer hardware designed by IBM that enables data encryption to be built into a microprocessor. It can be added to existing processors, and encrypts and decrypts data as it passes through them, without requiring any power from the processors themselves. Possible uses of the technology are to protect data on stolen devices and enforcement of digital rights management (DRM).

== See also ==
- Disk encryption hardware
