= Serial Bus Protocol 2 =

Communications protocol for a serial bus

The Serial Bus Protocol 2 (SBP-2) standard is a transport protocol within the Serial Bus, IEEE Std 1394-1995 (also known as FireWire or i.Link), developed by T10.

Original work on Serial Bus Protocol started as an attempt to adapt SCSI to IEEE Std 1394-1995 serial interface. Later on it was recognized that SBP-2 may have a more general use, and the work on the standard was targeted to provide a generic framework for delivery of commands, data, and status between Serial Bus peripherals.

== See also ==
- IEEE 1394
- DMA attack
- USB
