= Opal Storage Specification =

Data storage device security specification

The Opal Storage Specification is a set of specifications for features of data storage devices (such as hard disk drives and solid state drives) that enhance their security. For example, it defines a way of encrypting the stored data so that an unauthorized person who gains possession of the device cannot see the data. That is, it is a specification for self-encrypting drives (SED).

The specification is published by the Trusted Computing Group Storage Workgroup.

== Overview ==
The Opal SSC (Security Subsystem Class) is an implementation profile for Storage Devices (SD) built to:

- Protect the confidentiality of stored user data against unauthorized access once it leaves the owner's control (involving a power cycle and subsequent deauthentication).
- Enable interoperability between multiple SD vendors.

== Security ==
Radboud University researchers indicated in November 2018 that some hardware-encrypted SSDs, including some Opal implementations, had security vulnerabilities.

== Implementers of SSC ==
=== Device companies ===
- Hitachi
- Intel Corporation
- Kingston Technology
- Lenovo
- Micron Technology
- Samsung
- SanDisk
- Seagate Technology as "Seagate Secure"
- Toshiba

=== Storage controller companies ===
- Marvell
- Avago/LSI SandForce flash controllers

=== Software companies ===
- Absolute Software
- Check Point Software Technologies
- Dell Data Protection
- Cryptomill
- McAfee
- Secude
- Softex Incorporated
- Sophos
- Symantec (Symantec supports OPAL drives, but does not support hardware-based encryption.)
- Trend Micro
- WinMagic
- OpalLock (OpalLock support Self-Encrypt-Drive capable SSD and HDD. Develop by Fidelity Height LLC)

=== Computer OEMs ===
- Dell
- HP
- Lenovo
- Fujitsu
- Panasonic
- Getac
