= Control break =

Change in the value of one of the keys on which a file is sorted

In computer programming, a control break is a change in the value of one of the keys on which a file is sorted, which requires some extra processing. For example, with an input file sorted by post code, the number of items found in each postal district might need to be printed on a report, and a heading shown for the next district. Quite often there is a hierarchy of nested control breaks in a program, such as streets within districts within areas, with the need for a grand total at the end. Structured programming techniques have been developed to ensure correct processing of control breaks in languages such as COBOL and to ensure that conditions such as empty input files and sequence errors are handled properly.

With fourth-generation languages such as SQL, the programming language should handle most of the details of control breaks automatically.
