= Getac =

Taiwanese multinational technology company

Getac Holdings Corporation 神基控股股份有限公司
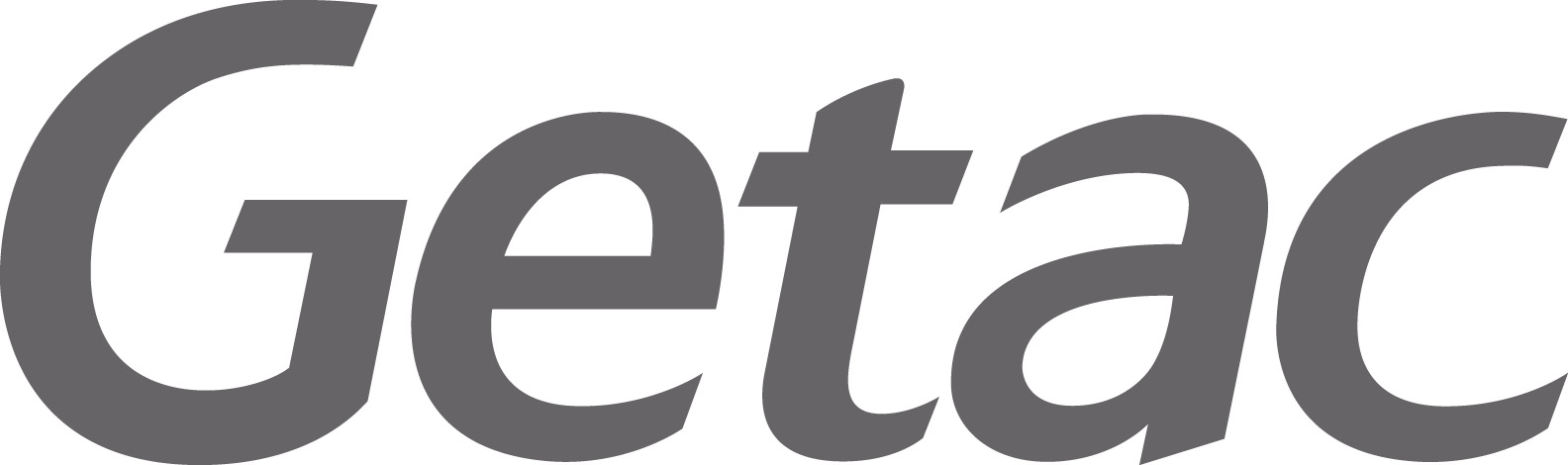
- Getac logo

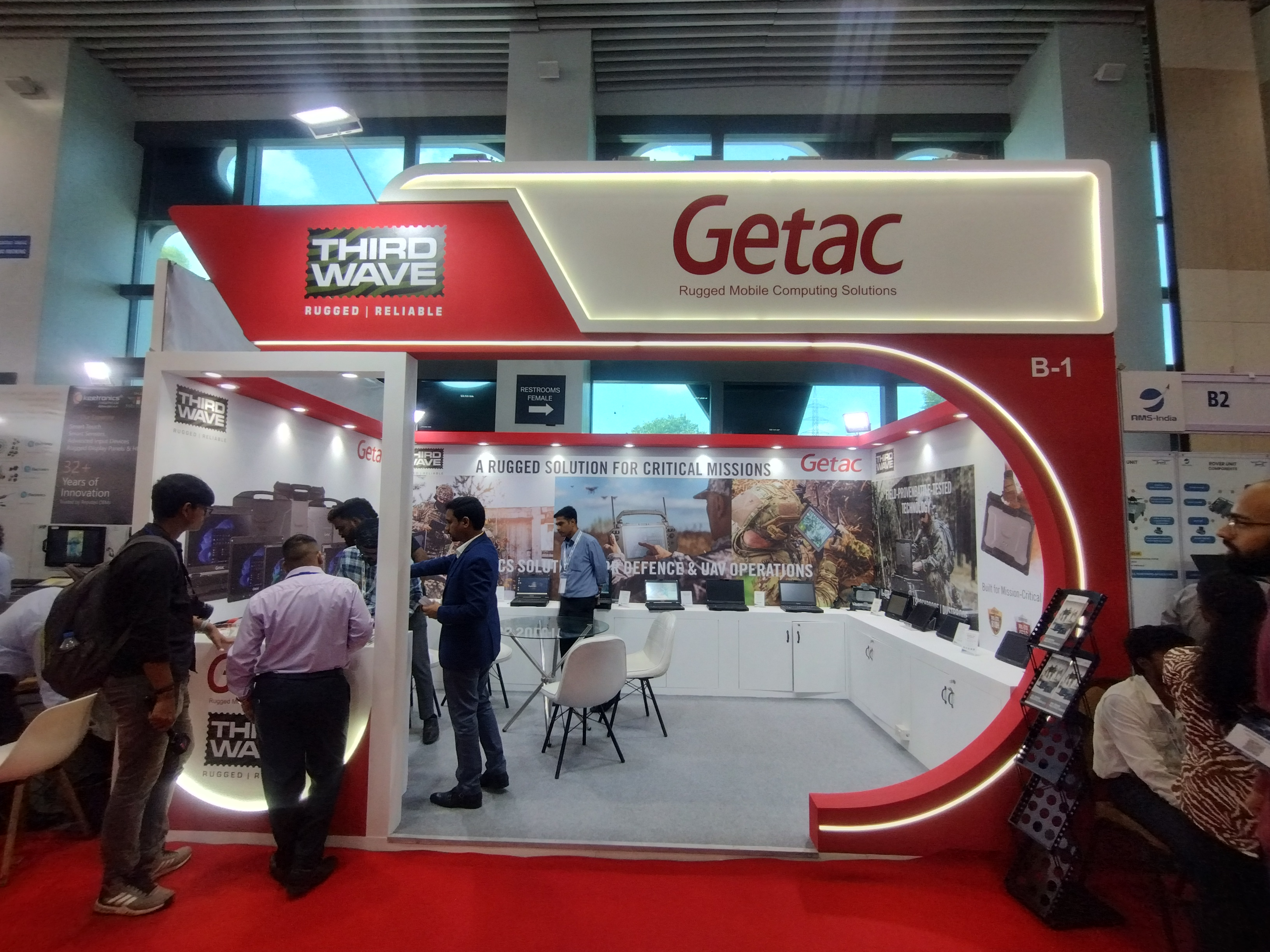
- Getac at DEF-TECH Bharat 2026, KTPO, Bengaluru
- Type: Public
- Traded as: TWSE: 3005
- Industry: Electronics
- Founded: 1989; 37 years ago
- Headquarters: Taiwan
- Key people: Matthew Miau (director); James Hwang (chairman)
- Products: Rugged computers, mechanical components, automotive parts, aerospace fasteners, body worn cameras, digital evidence management
- Number of employees: 10000+

Getac (Chinese: 神基控股) is a Taiwanese multinational technology company. It was established on 5 October 1989 as a joint venture with GE Aerospace. Getac is one of the major suppliers of rugged computers.

== History ==
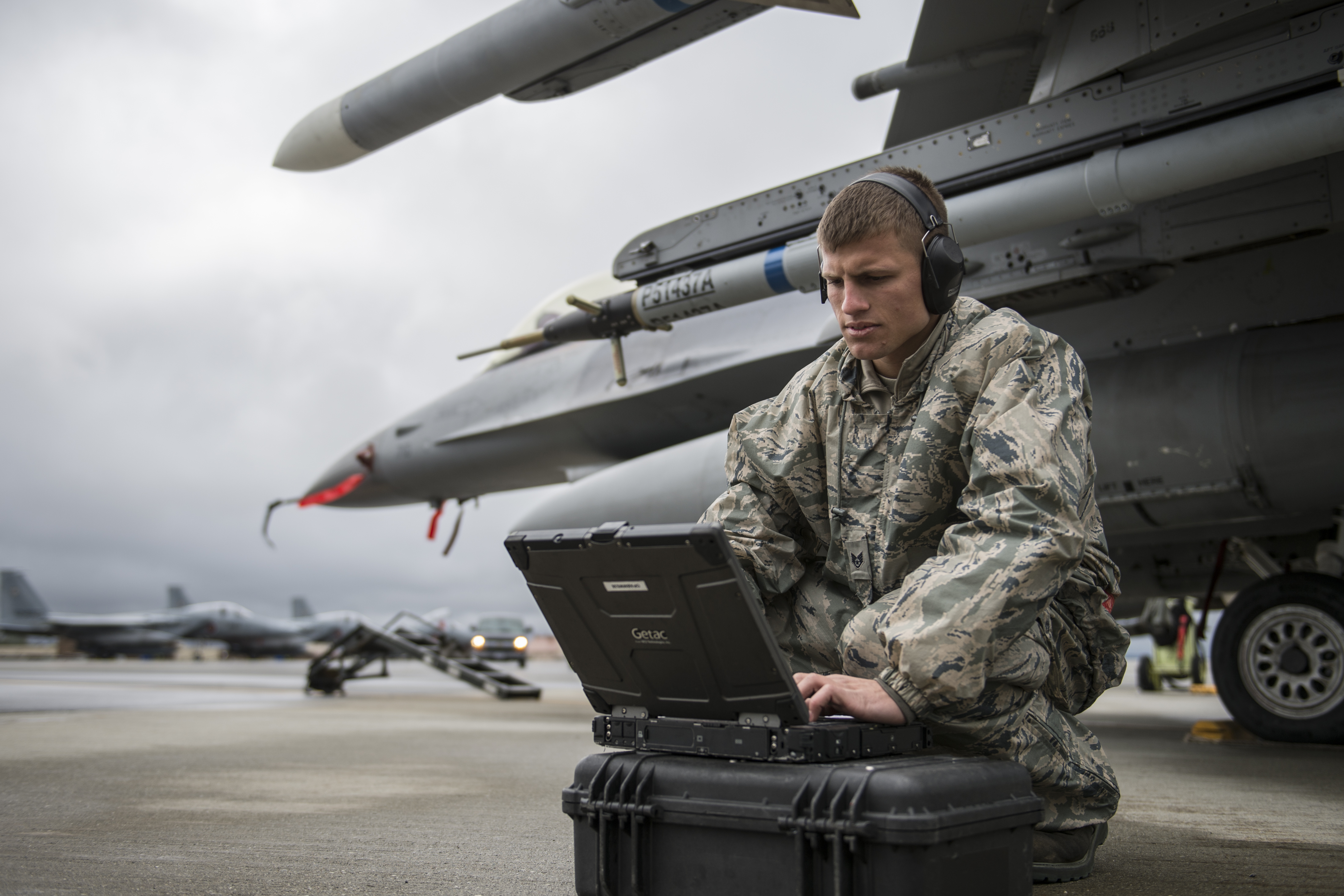
Getac laptop used by United States Air Force in 2014

Getac was established on 5 October 1989 as a joint venture with GE Aerospace.

In 2009, Getac acquired Waffer Technology Corp., which resulted in Getac becoming the world's third largest aluminum-magnesium alloy producer.

In 2012, the company introduced the Getac Z710, a rugged Android tablet.

In 2018, the company acquired WHP Workflow Solutions Inc. and formed Getac Video Solutions.

In 2020, Getac began selling rugged mobile devices to the BMW group. They began selling computers to the United States Air Force as part of the Client Computing Solutions Quantum Enterprise Buy (CCS-2 QEB) Program in 2021.

== See also ==
- List of companies of Taiwan
