= Crypto-shredding =

Deleting data by deleting encryption keys

Crypto-shredding or crypto erase (cryptographic erasure) is the practice of rendering encrypted data unusable by deliberately deleting or overwriting the encryption keys: assuming the key is not later recovered and the encryption is not broken, the data should become irrecoverable, effectively permanently deleted or "shredded". This requires that the data have been encrypted.

Data may be considered to exist in three states: data at rest, data in transit and data in use. General data security principles, such as in the CIA triad of confidentiality, integrity, and availability, require that all three states must be adequately protected. Deleting data at rest on storage media such as backup tapes, data stored in the cloud, computers, phones, or multi-function printers can present challenges when confidentiality of information is of concern. When encryption is in place, data disposal is easier, as less data (only the key material) needs to be destroyed.

== Motivations for use ==
There are various reasons for using crypto-shredding, including when the data is contained in defective or out-of-date systems, there is no further use for the data, the circumstances are such that there are no [longer] legal rights to use or retain the data, and other similar motivations. Legal obligations may also come from regulations such as the right to be forgotten, the General Data Protection Regulation, and others. Data security is largely influenced by confidentiality and privacy concerns.

== Use ==
In some cases all data storage is encrypted, such as encrypting entire harddisks, computer files, or databases. Alternatively only specific data may be encrypted, such as passport numbers, social security numbers, bank account numbers, person names, or record in a databases. Additionally, data in one system may be encrypted with separate keys when that same data is contained in multiple systems. When specific pieces of data are encrypted (possibly with different keys) it allows for more specific data shredding. There is no need to have access to the data (like an encrypted backup tape), only the encryption keys need to be shredded.

=== Example ===
iOS devices and Macintosh computers with an Apple silicon chip use crypto-shredding when performing the "Erase all content and settings" action by discarding all the keys in "effaceable storage". This renders all user data on the device cryptographically inaccessible, in a very short amount of time.
