= Raghupathy Sivakumar =

Raghupathy Sivakumar is a Professor and Wayne J. Holman Chair at Georgia Tech.

Sivakumar grew up in Chennai, India. He obtained Bachelor of Engineering degree in computer science in 1996 from Anna University. After graduation, he moved to Champaign, Illinois, where he attended University of Illinois at Urbana–Champaign from which he graduated with M.S. and Ph.D. degrees in 1998 and 2000 respectively. In August of 2000, he joined the Department of Electronics and Communication Engineering at Georgia Tech as an assistant professor.

He was named Fellow of the Institute of Electrical and Electronics Engineers (IEEE) in 2014 for contributions to the design of algorithms and protocols for wireless networking and mobile computing.
