= IEEE 1667 =

IEEE standard for authenticating removable storage devices such as USB flash drives

IEEE 1667 ("Standard Protocol for Authentication in Host Attachments of Transient Storage Devices") is a standard published and maintained by the IEEE that describes various methods for authenticating removable storage devices such as USB flash drives when they are inserted into a computer. The protocol is universal, and thus operating-system independent. It is currently part of Windows Vista (SP2) and Windows 7, Server 2008, Server 2012, Windows 8, Windows 8.1, Windows 10 and Windows 11.
