= Enterprise encryption gateway =

An enterprise encryption gateway (EEG) is a layer 2 encryption device, similar to VPN, that allows for strong authentication and encryption for data across a wireless medium. Unlike a residential gateway, an enterprise gateway typically has both an LAN and WLAN interface, where the EEG acts a bridge between the two. The client devices have client-side authentication/encryption software, and the EEGs are the encryption termination point in the network. Benefits of these devices include offloading the encryption duties from the access points. Autonomous access points are placed downstream from the EEGs and may act as an 802.1X authenticator.
