= DMA attack =

Cyberattack exploiting high-speed expansion ports

A DMA attack is a type of side channel attack in computer security, in which an attacker can penetrate a computer or other device, by exploiting the presence of high-speed expansion ports that permit direct memory access (DMA).

DMA is included in a number of connections, because it allows a connected device (such as a camcorder, network card, storage device or other useful accessory or internal PC card) to transfer data between itself and the computer at the maximum speed possible, by using direct hardware access to read or write directly to main memory without any operating system supervision or interaction. The legitimate uses of such devices have led to wide adoption of DMA accessories and connections, but an attacker can equally use the same facility to create an accessory that will connect using the same port, and can then potentially gain direct access to part or all of the physical memory address space of the computer, bypassing all OS security mechanisms and any lock screen, to read all that the computer is doing, steal data or cryptographic keys, install or run spyware and other exploits, or modify the system to allow backdoors or other malware.

Preventing physical connections to such ports will prevent DMA attacks. On many computers, the connections implementing DMA can also be disabled within the BIOS or UEFI if unused, which depending on the device can nullify or reduce the potential for this type of exploit.

Examples of connections that may allow DMA in some exploitable form include FireWire, CardBus, ExpressCard, Thunderbolt, USB4, PCI, PCI-X, and PCI Express.

== Description ==
In modern operating systems, non-system (i.e. user-mode) applications are prevented from accessing any memory locations not explicitly authorized by the virtual memory controller (called memory management unit (MMU)). In addition to containing damage that may be caused by software flaws and allowing more efficient use of physical memory, this architecture forms an integral part of the security of the operating system. However, kernel-mode drivers, many hardware devices, and user-mode vulnerabilities allow direct, unimpeded access of the physical memory address space. The physical address space includes all of the main system memory, as well as memory-mapped buses and hardware devices (which are controlled by the operating system through reads and writes as if they were ordinary RAM).

The OHCI 1394 specification allows devices, for performance reasons, to bypass the operating system and access physical memory directly without any security restrictions. But SBP2 devices can easily be spoofed, making it possible to trick an operating system into allowing an attacker to both read and write physical memory, and thereby to gain unauthorised access to sensitive cryptographic material in memory.

Systems may still be vulnerable to a DMA attack by an external device if they have a FireWire, ExpressCard, Thunderbolt or other expansion port that, like PCI and PCI Express in general, connects attached devices directly to the physical rather than virtual memory address space. Therefore, systems that do not have a FireWire port may still be vulnerable if they have a PCMCIA/CardBus/PC Card or ExpressCard port that would allow an expansion card with a FireWire to be installed.

== Uses ==
An attacker could, for example, use a social engineering attack and send a "lucky winner" a rogue Thunderbolt device. Upon connecting to a computer, the device, through its direct and unimpeded access to the physical address space, would be able to bypass almost all security measures of the OS and have the ability to read encryption keys, install malware, or control other system devices. The attack can also easily be executed where the attacker has physical access to the target computer.

In addition to the abovementioned nefarious uses, there are some beneficial uses too as the DMA features can be used for kernel debugging purposes.

Online video game cheaters use specialized DMA cards to access a game's memory, providing features such as seeing through walls. This method uses a second computer to analyze the memory dump without requiring any software modification on the computer that a game is running on, making it much harder to detect than conventional cheats. A cheater may use a FPGA card with malicious firmware to do DMA cheating. Delta Force is notorious for its tug-of-war between cheaters and Anti-Cheat Expert developers. In May 2026, Riot Games' anti-cheat was reportedly accused of bricking PCs when attempting to block DMA cheating.

There is a tool called Inception for DMA attack, only requiring a machine with an expansion port susceptible to this attack. Another application known to exploit this vulnerability to gain unauthorized access to running Windows, Mac OS and Linux computers is the spyware FinFireWire.

== Mitigations ==
DMA attacks can be prevented by physical security against potentially malicious devices.

Kernel-mode drivers have many powers to compromise the security of a system, and care must be taken to load trusted, bug-free drivers. For example, recent 64-bit versions of Microsoft Windows require drivers to be tested and digitally signed by Microsoft, and prevent any non-signed drivers from being installed.

An IOMMU is a technology that applies the concept of virtual memory to such system busses, and can be used to close this security vulnerability (as well as increase system stability). Intel brands its IOMMU as VT-d. AMD brands its IOMMU as AMD-Vi. Linux, Windows 10 and Windows 11 kernel and drivers can use these IOMMUs to block some DMA transactions that have not been allowed. If the "OS DMA Protection" features are properly configured by the UEFI/BIOS, Linux, Windows 10 and Windows 11 can further use IOMMUs to protect against DMA attacks. As of 2012, Apple macOS also supports using IOMMUs to thwart DMA attacks.

Newer operating systems may take steps to prevent DMA attacks. Recent Linux kernels include the option to disable DMA by FireWire devices while allowing other functions. Windows 8.1 can prevent access to DMA ports of an unattended machine if the console is locked. But as of 2019, the major OS vendors had not taken into account the variety of ways that a malicious device could take advantage of complex interactions between multiple emulated peripherals, exposing subtle bugs and vulnerabilities.

Never allowing sensitive data to be stored in RAM unencrypted is another mitigation venue against DMA attacks. However, protection against reading the RAM's content is not enough, as writing to RAM via DMA may compromise seemingly secure storage outside of RAM by code injection. An example of the latter kind of attack is TRESOR-HUNT, which exposes cryptographic keys that are never stored in RAM (but only in certain CPU registers); TRESOR-HUNT achieves this by overwriting parts of the operating system.

Microsoft recommends changes to the default Windows configuration to prevent this if it is a concern.

== See also ==
- FireWire security issue
- Cold boot attack
- Pin control attack
