= Trusted Computing Group =

American-based computer technology consortium

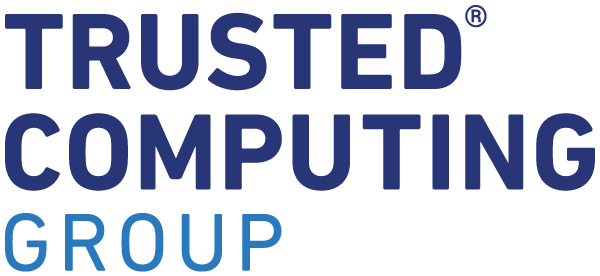
- Type: Consortium
- Founded: 2003
- Founder: AMD, Hewlett-Packard, IBM, Intel, Microsoft
- Headquarters: Beaverton, OR, United States
- Website: trustedcomputinggroup.org

The Trusted Computing Group is a group formed in 2003 as the successor to the Trusted Computing Platform Alliance which was previously formed in 1999 to implement Trusted Computing concepts across personal computers. Members include Intel, AMD, IBM, Microsoft, and Cisco.

The core idea of trusted computing is to give hardware manufacturers control over what software does and does not run on a system by refusing to run unsigned software.

== History ==
Logo as of 2004

On October 11, 1999, the Trusted Computing Platform Alliance (abbreviated as TCPA), a consortium of various technology companies including Compaq, Hewlett-Packard, IBM, Intel, and Microsoft, was formed in an effort to promote trust and security in the personal computing platform. In November 1999, the TCPA announced that over 70 leading hardware and software companies joined the alliance in the first month. On January 30, 2001, version 1.0 of the Trusted Computing Platform Specifications was released. IBM was the first original equipment manufacturer to incorporate hardware features based on the specifications with the introduction of its ThinkPad T30 mobile computer in 2002.

In 2003, the TCPA was succeeded by the Trusted Computing Group, with an increased emphasis on mobile devices.

Membership fees vary by level. Promoters pay annual membership fees of $30,000, contributors pay $15,000, and depending upon company size, adopters pay annual membership fees of either $2,500 or $7,500.

== Overview ==
TCG's most successful effort was the development of a Trusted Platform Module (TPM), a semiconductor intellectual property core or integrated circuit that conforms to the specification to enable trusted computing features in computers and mobile devices. Related efforts involved Trusted Network Connect, to bring trusted computing to network connections, and Storage Core Architecture / Security Subsystem Class, to bring trusted computing to disk drives and other storage devices. These efforts have not achieved the same level of widespread adoption as the trusted platform module.

== Criticism ==
The group historically faced opposition from the free software community on the grounds that the technology had a negative impact on the users' privacy and can create customer lock-in, especially if it is used to create DRM applications. It received criticism from the Linux and FreeBSD communities, as well as the software development community in general.

== ISO standardization ==
In 2009, ISO/IEC release trusted platform module standards

- ISO/IEC 11889-1:2009 Information technology—Trusted Platform Module—Part 1: Overview
- ISO/IEC 11889-2:2009 Information technology—Trusted Platform Module—Part 2: Design principles
- ISO/IEC 11889-3:2009 Information technology—Trusted Platform Module—Part 3: Structures
- ISO/IEC 11889-4:2009 Information technology—Trusted Platform Module—Part 4: Commands
