= RootkitRevealer =

Sysinternals RootkitRevealer
- Developers: Bryce Cogswell and Mark Russinovich
- Final release: 1.7 / November 1, 2006; 19 years ago
- Written in: Microsoft C++
- Operating system: Windows XP and Windows Server 2003
- Platform: IA-32
- Size: 231 KB
- Available in: English
- Type: Security software
- License: Closed-source freeware
- Website: technet.microsoft.com/en-us/sysinternals/bb897445

RootkitRevealer is a proprietary freeware tool for rootkit detection on Microsoft Windows by Bryce Cogswell and Mark Russinovich. It runs on Windows XP and Windows Server 2003 (32-bit-versions only). Its output lists Windows Registry and file system API discrepancies that may indicate the presence of a rootkit. It is the same tool that triggered the Sony BMG copy protection rootkit scandal.

RootkitRevealer is no longer being developed.

== See also ==
- Sysinternals
- Process Explorer
- Process Monitor
- ProcDump
