= Joanna Rutkowska =

Polish hacker and computer security expert (born 1981)

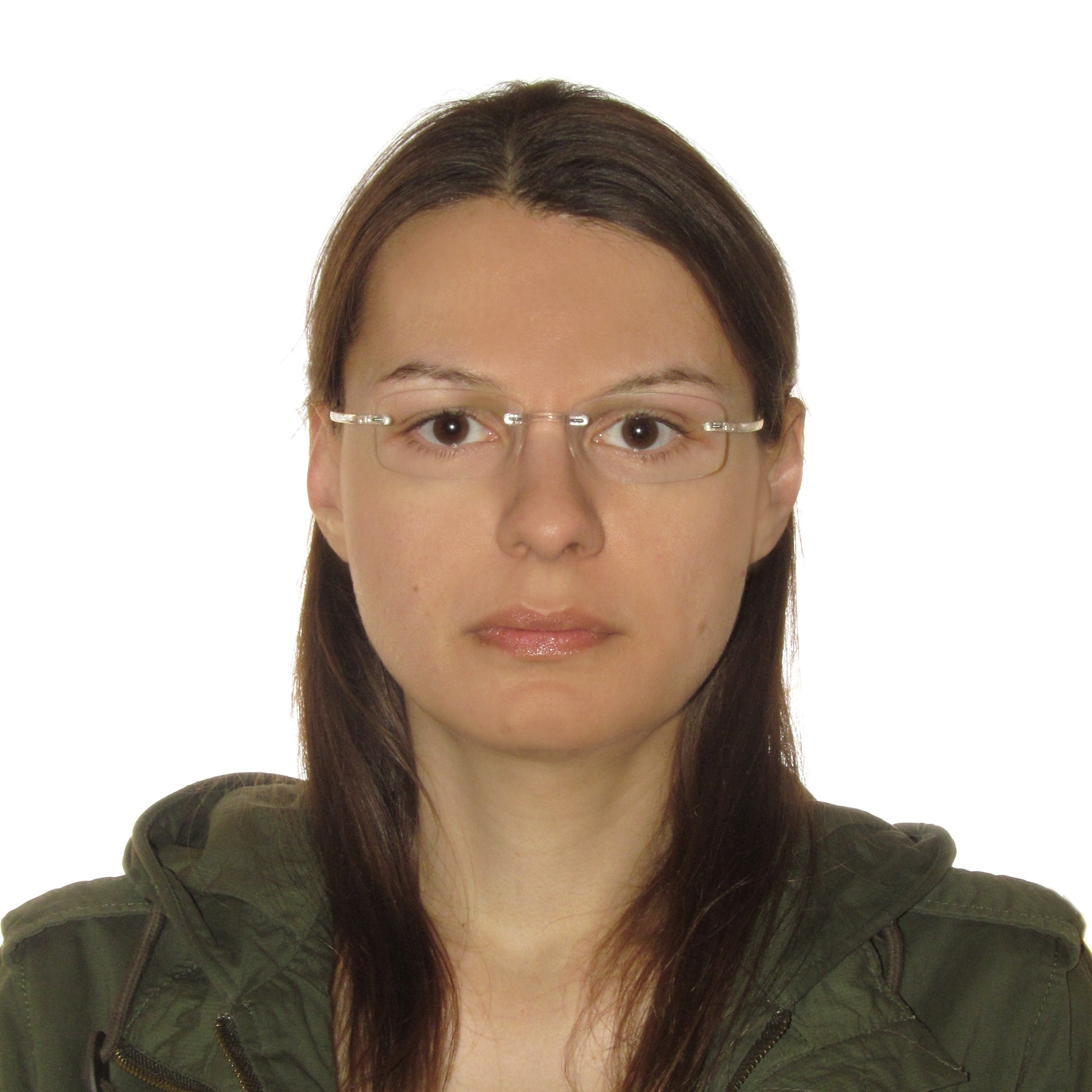
- Portrait of Rutkowska, May 2018
- Born: 1981 (age 44–45); Warsaw, Warsaw Capital Voivodeship, Polish People's Republic
- Education: Warsaw University of Technology (Master's degree in computer science)
- Occupations: Security researcher; founder of Invisible Things Lab
- Employer: Invisible Things Lab
- Known for: Blue Pill, Evil Maid attack, Qubes OS
- Website: tracesofhumanity.org

Joanna Rutkowska (born 1981) is a Polish computer security researcher, primarily known for her research on low-level security and stealth malware, and as founder of the Qubes OS security-focused desktop operating system.

== Career ==
She became known in the security community after the Black Hat Briefings conference in Las Vegas in August 2006. At the time a researcher with the security firm COSEINC, she gave a talk titled "Subverting Vista Kernel For Fun And Profit", in which she demonstrated two attacks: a method of loading unsigned code into the Vista kernel, bypassing its driver signing requirement, and a technique dubbed Blue Pill, which used AMD's SVM hardware virtualization to move a running OS into a virtual machine controlled by a thin hypervisor. She claimed that malware using this technique would be undetectable. Subsequently, she was named one of the Five Hackers Who Left a Mark on 2006 by eWeek Magazine for her research on the topic. The original concept of Blue Pill was published by another researcher at IEEE Oakland in May 2006 under the name VMBR.

During the following years, Rutkowska continued to focus on low-level security. In 2007 she demonstrated that certain types of hardware-based memory acquisition (e.g. FireWire based) are unreliable and can be defeated. At Black Hat USA in August 2007 she argued that Vista's kernel protection could be bypassed using poorly written third-party drivers, citing ATI and NVIDIA video drivers as examples, and presented a new version of Blue Pill, rewritten from scratch, with support for nested virtualization. Together with team member Alexander Tereshkin, she disputed claims by other researchers that such virtualization-based malware could be reliably detected. In 2008, Rutkowska with her team focused on Xen hypervisor security. In 2009, together with team member Rafał Wojtczuk, she presented an attack against Intel Trusted Execution Technology and Intel System Management Mode.

In April 2007, Rutkowska founded Invisible Things Lab in Warsaw, Poland. The company focuses on OS and VMM security research and provides various consulting services. At the company she carried out offensive system security research together with Rafał Wojtczuk and Alexander Tereshkin, which later informed the work on Qubes OS. In a 2009 blog post she coined the term "evil maid attack", detailing a method for accessing encrypted data on disk by compromising the firmware via an external USB flash drive.

In 2010, she and Rafał Wojtczuk began working on the Qubes OS security-oriented desktop Xen distribution, which currently utilizes Fedora Linux as the admin qube. The initial release of Qubes 1.0 was completed by 3 September 2012. Its main concept is "security by compartmentalization", using domains implemented as lightweight Xen virtual machines to isolate various subsystems. Each compartment is referred to as a qube, which operates as a separate virtual machine. The project refers to itself as "a reasonably secure operating system" and has received endorsements by numerous privacy and security experts. It is fairly unique in its capabilities, having a design informed by research on proven vulnerabilities in the trusted compute base (TCB), that are unaddressed in most common desktop operating systems.

She has published seminal works on systems trustability, most recently Intel x86 Considered Harmful and State Considered Harmful - A Proposal for a Stateless Laptop. Rutkowska has been invited as an esteemed presenter at security conferences, such as Chaos Communication Congress, Black Hat Briefings, HITB, RSA Conference, RISK, EuSecWest & Gartner IT Security Summit.

In October 2018, after nine years spent mostly on Qubes OS, Rutkowska announced that she was handing over the leadership of the project to Marek Marczykowski-Górecki, who had already been leading most of its day-to-day development, while she would remain an advisor to the project. The same month she joined the Golem Project as Chief Strategy Officer, also serving as Chief Security Officer.
