= Dr. Watson (disambiguation) =

Dr. Watson is a fictional character in Sir Arthur Conan Doyle's Sherlock Holmes stories.

Dr. Watson may also refer to:

- Dr. Watson (debugger), Microsoft Windows diagnostic tool
- Dr. Watson, bishop of Lincoln (1515–1584), Catholic Bishop
- James D. Watson (born 1928), Nobel Prize-winning geneticist
- Thomas A. Watson (1854–1934), inventor and assistant to Alexander Graham Bell, notably in the invention of the telephone
- John B. Watson (1878–1958), psychologist and pioneer of behaviorism
