= Tactical NAV =

Precision navigation app for military personnel

- Original author: Jonathan J. Springer
- Developer: TacNav Systems
- Release: February 14, 2011; 15 years ago
- Operating system: iOS, Android
- Platform: iPhone
- Website: tacticalnav.com

Tactical NAV, also known as TACNAV-X, is a location-based tracking app designed for use by military personnel. The app is primarily designed to assist in pinpointing enemy fire and mapping waypoints.

Tactical NAV also helps users efficiently relay critical information to tactical operations centers for prompt decision-making regarding airstrikes or medical evacuations.

The TACNAV-X platform is intended to enhance situational awareness, refine navigation capabilities, and assist in tactical decision-making across various operational environments.

== Overview ==
Tactical NAV allows users to pinpoint enemy fire.

== History ==
Tactical NAV was designed by U.S. Army Captain Jonathan J. Springer, a Field Artillery officer serving as a Battalion Fire Support Officer (FSO) in the 101st Airborne Division. Springer conceived the idea for the app during his third tour in Afghanistan in support of Operation Enduring Freedom.

On June 25, 2010, after a rocket attack by the Taliban killed two soldiers in his battalion, he was inspired to create an app that would prevent similar losses in the future, enhance situational awareness, and assist soldiers serving on combat deployments.

In 2010, Springer founded TacNav Systems (formerly AppDaddy Technologies) to develop mobile applications for use by military personnel. He tested the app during combat operations in eastern Afghanistan and verified TACNAV-X's accuracy using DAGRs, AFATDS, Falcon View, CPOF, ATAK, and other approved Department of Defense (DoD) systems.

As of 2012, the app had been downloaded 8,000 times.

== See also ==
- Device tracking software
- Real-time locating system
- GPS tracking unit
