= Absolute Home & Office =

Computer software

Absolute Home & Office (originally known as CompuTrace, and LoJack for Laptops) is a proprietary laptop theft recovery software (laptop tracking software). The persistent security features are built into the firmware of devices. Absolute Home & Office has services of an investigations and recovery team who partners with law enforcement agencies to return laptops to their owners. Absolute Security licensed the name LoJack from the vehicle recovery service LoJack in 2005.

Analysis of Absolute Home & Office (LoJack) by Kaspersky Lab shows that in rare cases, the software was preactivated without user authorization. The software agent behaves like a rootkit, reinstalling a small installer agent into the Windows OS at boot time. This installer later downloads the full agent from Absolute Security's servers via the internet. This installer is vulnerable to certain local attacks, and attacks from hackers who can control network communications of the victim.

== Functionality ==
Once installed, the Absolute Home & Office agent makes itself persistent by making an initial call to the "Monitoring Center". The software may be updated by modules, downloaded from a command server. Subsequent contact occurs daily, checking to ensure the agent remains installed and provides detailed data such as location, user, software, and hardware.

If the device is stolen the owner is able to contact the company. Then, the next time the protected device connects to the internet, it switches to theft mode and accelerates Monitoring Center communication. The Investigations and Recovery team forensically mine the computer using key captures, registry and file scanning, geolocation, and other investigative techniques. The team works with local law enforcement to recover the protected device, and provides police with evidence to pursue criminal charges. In the event of theft, a user can log into their online account to remotely lock the computer or delete sensitive files to avoid identity theft.

Absolute Home & Office comes preinstalled in some Acer, Asus, Fujitsu, Panasonic, Toshiba, Dell, HP and Lenovo machines. Apple, unlike some other PC manufacturers, does not allow the software to be installed in the BIOS. Absolute Home & Office can be installed on Apple computers, but it will be stored on the hard drive instead of the BIOS. If the hard drive is replaced or reformatted, the software will be lost.

The BIOS service is disabled by default and can be enabled by purchasing a license for Absolute Home & Office; upon being enabled, the BIOS will copy a downloader agent named rpcnetp.exe from the BIOS flash ROM to the System32 folder on Windows systems. On some Toshiba laptops, rpcnetp.exe is factory-preinstalled by Toshiba on the unit's hard drive. In turn, rpcnetp.exe will download the full agent software and install the rpcnet.exe Windows service. From then on, rpcnet.exe will phone home to Absolute Security servers once a day, querying for a possible theft report, and transmitting the results of a system scan, IP address, user- and machine names and location data, which it obtains either by tapping the GPS data stream on machines equipped with GPS hardware, or by triangulating available WLAN access points in the vicinity, by providing WLAN IDs and signal strengths so Absolute Security servers can geolocate the device using the Mexens Technology data base. If Absolute Security receives a theft report, the service can be remotely commanded to phone home every 15 minutes, install additional 3rd party vendor software, such as a key logger or a forensic package, make screenshots, and various other actions.

Absolute Home & Office also supports Intel's AT-p anti-theft protection scheme. If it is unable to phone home within a configurable time interval it will require a special BIOS password upon the next reboot. It can be configured to shut down the machine's power supply immediately in this case, to force a reboot.

=== Persistence ===
The persistence module, installed as part of system BIOS/UEFI, detects when the Absolute Home & Office software has been removed. It ensures the software is automatically reinstalled even if the hard drive is replaced, or the firmware is flashed. Absolute Security partners with many original equipment manufacturers to embed this technology in the firmware of computers, netbooks, smartphones, and tablets by Acer, ASUS, Dell, Fujitsu, HP, Lenovo, Motion, Panasonic, Samsung and Toshiba.

== Vulnerabilities ==
The Absolute Home & Office client has trojan and rootkit-like behavior, but some of its modules have been whitelisted by several antivirus vendors.

At the Black Hat Briefings conference in 2009, researchers showed that the implementation of the Computrace/LoJack agent embedded in the BIOS has vulnerabilities and that this "available control of the anti-theft agent allows a highly dangerous form of BIOS-enhanced rootkit that can bypass all chipset or installation restrictions and reutilize many existing features offered in this kind of software." Absolute Security rejected the claims made in the research, stating that "the presence of the Computrace module in no way weakens the security of the BIOS". Another independent analyst confirmed the flaws, noted that a malware hijacking attack would be a "highly exotic one", and suggested that the larger concern was that savvy thieves could disable the phone home feature. Later, Core Security Technologies proved the researcher's finding by making publicly available several proofs of concept, videos, and utilities on its webpage.

Local and remote exploitation of the first stage CompuTrace agent, which is used to install the full version after activation or reinstallation of the operating system, was demonstrated at BlackHat USA 2014. This dropper agent is whitelisted by several antivirus vendors and can be used to set up some local attacks, for example to download and install software from different servers. ESET discovered a first attack in the wild with a rootkit called LoJax that infected vulnerable LoJack configurations.

== See also ==
- Prey (software)
