= Winqual =

Former web service provided by Microsoft

Windows Quality Online Services (Winqual) was a Microsoft web service providing a developer dashboard to certification for the Microsoft Windows logo programs and access to the Windows Error Reporting (WER) data. In preparation for Windows 8 the Winqual site was retired and its features were rolled together with an interface for creating a developer account and managing your Windows Store Apps called Windows Dev Center.

End-users may have accessed the Winqual site through windows error reporting response links or other references to the infrastructure in the Windows Error Reporting systems.

== Windows error reporting ==
Through the old Winqual site and the new Windows Dev Center, Independent software vendors (ISVs) can access the WER data to triage, fix, and provide responses to error reports generated by their software. Driver packages that have successfully completed the certification program can be added to the driver distribution system and pushed out to users through Windows Update. Driver submissions are automatically mapped to the company's account for which the submission was made.

The Windows Error Reporting system is enabled to triage and map crash data. If it is determined that the root cause of the issue is in a driver or software product that maps to a company with a Winqual account, then that crash bucket will be assigned to that account. Winqual users with the permissions to view crash data can then download samples of the relevant crash data (in the form of memory dumps, logs, and optional additional information that the end-user having the issue has agreed to submit).

An important feature of the WER system is the ability for developers to provide fixes for a particular crash bucket and Windows Update is the mechanism that Windows uses to inform the Windows user that there is a fix to the problem that they just reported or that a problem they reported previously has been resolved. Used correctly this system can eliminate the need for the user to have to call a help desk to report the issue and wait for the problem to be researched and then provided with an update that resolves the program they encountered. Since the buckets are organized by a signature of the stack at the point of failure, it is unlikely that this signature will look the same for two different issues. Solutions are mapping to buckets so when a stack trace is reported with the same signature the user can be informed in real time if there is fix to the crash (or hang) that maps to that particular bucket. Fixes for qualified drivers are distributed via Windows Update and if an issue that previously did not have a solution will be remembered so when a fix becomes available the end user will be informed that there is a fix that resolves the previously reported issue.

The system also allows the developer to request that users that are hitting a particular issue where the crash dump does not have the information needed to determine the root cause of the crash should opt into submitting additional information (such as application logs) that might help determine the root cause of the problem. Windows 7 even includes a way that the developer can request that users hitting a particular problem should be asked if they consent to helping them solve this problem by enabling a feature in the OS that captures screen shots and the keyboard input leading up the problem and including it in the crash report that is sent to Microsoft. The end user must consent to this and Microsoft has to manually enable this request on a specific bucket.

Software and hardware manufacturers can link error signatures to Windows Error Reporting Responses. This allows distributing solutions as well as collecting extra information from customers (such as reproducing the steps they took before the crash) and providing them with support links.

To register with the site and collect WER data a user had to create an account, sign several legal agreements and then submit a VeriSign Class 3 Digital ID signed executable to verify the ISV as being the creator of the crashing program or driver.

== Crashes ==
The ability to report crash and hang data from Windows Platforms was first introduced in Windows XP and has been significantly improved in Windows Vista with features such as Problem Reports and Solutions which is a Control Panel user interface allowing users to check the status of their crashes and personalized solution views.

== See also ==
- Windows Error Reporting
- Dr. Watson
