= EMCO MoveOnBoot =

Freeware utility for Windows

- Developer(s): EMCO Software
- Stable release: 2.3.3 (April 17, 2013; 12 years ago) [±]
- Operating system: Windows XP and later
- Platform: .NET Framework 3.5 SP1 and above
- Size: 33.4 MB
- Available in: English
- Type: Utility software
- License: Freeware
- Website: emcosoftware.com/move-on-boot

EMCO MoveOnBoot is a freeware utility for managing locked file system resources on the Windows platform. The utility allows moving, renaming or deleting selected locked files or folders during the next Windows reboot.

== Functionality ==
EMCO MoveOnBoot is a GUI tool that allows scheduling file and folder management tasks to be performed automatically by Windows at the next reboot. It can be used to manage resources locked by the system or running applications. During a reboot, the locked files and folders are unreferenced, and the pending move, rename and delete operations can be completed by Windows.

EMCO MoveOnBoot allows selecting one or multiple file system resources and scheduling move, rename or delete operations to be performed with these resources on the next reboot. It is possible to schedule multiple actions, as well as review and cancel the already scheduled actions.

== Limitations ==
EMCO MoveOnBoot uses the standard Windows mechanism for delaying file operations until reboot based on the WinAPI MoveFileEx functionality. This mechanism has a few limitations: it isn't possible to manage resources located on external disks and administrative permissions are required to use EMCO MoveOnBoot.

== Alternatives ==
Windows Sysinternals distributes command-line utilities for managing files that are in use. The MoveFile utility allows scheduling file move or deletion on the next computer reboot. The PendMoves utility displays the moves and deletions that have been scheduled.
