= VME =

VME may refer to:

== Computing ==
- ICL VME, (Virtual Machine Environment) a mainframe computer operating system developed by International Computers Limited
- VMEbus, the ANSI/IEEE computer hardware bus standard
- Virtual machine escape is the process of breaking out of a virtual machine and interacting with the host operating system
- Virtual Mode Extensions, an undocumented extension of the Intel Pentium in v86 mode, "Virtual 8086 Mode Enhancements" in later Intel processors
  - vme, a flag in a modern x86 CPU indicating support of Virtual 8086 mode
- VME (CONFIG.SYS directive), a configuration directive under OS/2

== Other uses ==
- V-me, a Spanish-language TV network in the United States
- Voices Music & Entertainment, a Norwegian record label
