= Bill Blunden (author) =

American non-fiction writer

William Alva Blunden (born December 3, 1969) is the author of several books including The Rootkit Arsenal: Escape and Evasion in the Dark Corners of the System, Behold A Pale Farce: Cyberwar, Threat Inflation & The Malware Industrial Complex, Cube Farm, and Software Exorcism. The jacket of the former work lists his credentials MCSE, MCITP, and Enterprise Administrator. He is also active in the social sciences space and helped author articles appearing in Peace and Conflict: Journal of Peace Psychology.
