= Virtual machine escape =

Method of compromising a host OS though the VM

In computer security, virtual machine escape (VM escape) is the process of a program breaking out of the virtual machine (VM) on which it is running and interacting with the host operating system. In theory, a virtual machine is a "completely isolated guest operating system installation within a normal host operating system", but this is not always the case in practice.

For example, in 2008, a vulnerability (CVE-2008-0923) in VMware discovered by Core Security Technologies made VM escape possible on VMware Workstation 6.0.2 and 5.5.4. A fully working exploit labeled Cloudburst was developed by Immunity Inc. for Immunity CANVAS (a commercial penetration testing tool). Cloudburst was presented at Black Hat USA 2009.

== Previous known vulnerabilities ==
- CVE-2007-4993 Xen pygrub: Command injection in grub.conf file.
- CVE-2007-1744 Directory traversal vulnerability in shared folders feature for VMware
- CVE-2008-0923 Directory traversal vulnerability in shared folders feature for VMware
- CVE-2008-1943 Xen Para Virtualized Frame Buffer backend buffer overflow.
- CVE-2009-1244 Cloudburst: VM display function in VMware
- CVE-2011-1751 QEMU-KVM: PIIX4 emulation does not check if a device is hotpluggable before unplugging
- CVE-2012-0217 The x86-64 kernel system-call functionality in Xen 4.1.2 and earlier
- CVE-2014-0983 Oracle VirtualBox 3D acceleration multiple memory corruption
- CVE-2015-3456 VENOM: buffer-overflow in QEMU's virtual floppy disk controller
- CVE-2015-7504 QEMU-KVM: Heap overflow in pcnet_receive function.
- CVE-2015-7835 Xen Hypervisor: Uncontrolled creation of large page mappings by PV guests
- CVE-2016-6258 Xen Hypervisor: The PV pagetable code has fast-paths for making updates to pre-existing pagetable entries, to skip expensive re-validation in safe cases (e.g. clearing only Access/Dirty bits). The bits considered safe were too broad, and not actually safe.
- CVE-2016-7092 Xen Hypervisor: Disallow L3 recursive pagetable for 32-bit PV guests
- CVE-2017-5715, 2017-5753, 2017-5754: The Spectre and Meltdown hardware vulnerabilities, a cache side-channel attack on CPU level (Rogue Data Cache Load (RDCL)), allow a rogue process to read all memory of a computer, even outside the memory assigned to a virtual machine
- CVE-2017-0075 Hyper-V Remote Code Execution Vulnerability
- CVE-2017-0109 Hyper-V Remote Code Execution Vulnerability
- CVE-2017-4903 VMware ESXi, Workstation, Fusion: SVGA driver contains buffer overflow that may allow guests to execute code on hosts
- CVE-2017-4934 VMware Workstation, Fusion: Heap buffer-overflow vulnerability in VMNAT device that may allow a guest to execute code on the host
- CVE-2017-4936 VMware Workstation, Horizon View : Multiple out-of-bounds read issues via Cortado ThinPrint may allow a guest to execute code or perform a Denial of Service on the Windows OS
- CVE-2018-2698 Oracle VirtualBox: shared memory interface by the VGA allows read and writes on the host OS
- CVE-2018-6981 VMware ESXi, Workstation, Fusion: Uninitialized stack memory usage in the vmxnet3 virtual network adapter.
- CVE-2018-12126, CVE-2018-12130, CVE-2018-12127, CVE-2019-11091: "Microarchitectural Data Sampling" (MDS) attacks: Similar to above Spectre and Meltdown attacks, this cache side-channel attack on CPU level allows to read data across VMs and even data of the host system. Sub types: Microarchitectural Store Buffer Data Sampling (MSBDS), Microarchitectural Fill Buffer Data Sampling (MFBDS) = Zombieload, Microarchitectural Load Port Data Sampling (MLPDS), and Microarchitectural Data Sampling Uncacheable Memory (MDSUM)
- CVE-2019-0719, CVE-2019-0721, CVE-2019-1389, CVE-2019-1397, CVE-2019-1398 Windows Hyper-V Remote Code Execution Vulnerability
- CVE-2019-18420, CVE-2019-18421, CVE-2019-18422, CVE-2019-18423, CVE-2019-18424, CVE-2019-18425: Xen Hypervisor and Citrix Hypervisor: Allows guest virtual machines to compromise the host system (denial of service and rights escalation)
- CVE-2019-5183 (critical), CVE-2019-5124, CVE-2019-5146, CVE-2019-5147: Windows 10 and VMWare Workstation using AMD Radeon graphics cards using Adrenalin driver: attacker in guest system can use pixel shader to cause memory error on the host system, injecting malicious code to the host system and execute it.
- CVE-2018-12130, CVE-2019-11135, CVE-2020-0548: ZombieLoad, ZombieLoad v2, Vector Register Sampling (VRS), Microarchitectural Data Sampling (MDS), Transactional Asynchronous Abort (TAA), CacheOut, L1D Eviction Sampling (L1DES): L1 cache side attacks on CPU level allow virtual machines to read memory outside of their sandbox
- CVE-2020-3962, CVE-2020-3963, CVE-2020-3964, CVE-2020-3965, CVE-2020-3966, CVE-2020-3967, CVE-2020-3968, CVE-2020-3969, CVE-2020-3970, CVE-2020-3971: VMware ESXi, Workstation Pro / Player, Fusion Pro, Cloud Foundation: Vulnerabilities in SVGA, graphics shader, USB driver, xHCI/EHCI, PVNVRAM, and vmxnet3 can cause virtual machine escape

== See also ==
- Hyperjacking
