= Channel 9 (Microsoft) =

Video and podcast hosting website for Microsoft employees

- Homepage
- Website type: Video hosting, podcasting
- Available in: English
- Creator: Microsoft
- Website: channel9.msdn.com (Archived)
- Registration: Optional
- Launched: April, 2004
- Current status: Inactive

Channel 9 was a Microsoft website for hosting videos and podcasts created by employees of Microsoft.

Launched in 2004 when Microsoft's corporate reputation was at a low, Channel 9 was the company's first blog. It was named after the United Airlines audio channel that lets airplane passengers listen to the cockpit's conversations unhindered; the site published conversations among Microsoft developers, rather than its chairman Bill Gates, who had historically been the "face" of Microsoft. This made it an inexpensive alternative to Microsoft's Professional Developers Conference, then the main public platform where customers and outside developers could speak to Microsoft employees without the intervention of the company's PR department. The Channel 9 team produced interviews with Bill Gates, Erik Meijer, and Mark Russinovich.

On November 5, 2021, it was announced that Microsoft would merge Channel 9 into Microsoft Learn. The move was completed on December 1, effectively rendering the original site defunct. However, past videos from the former site can still be seen there.

Channel 9, in its final form, was not a community website and did not host any content made by the community. That had not always been the case. The site once hosted discussion forums, as well as a wiki based on Microsoft's own FlexWiki. The wiki had been used to provide ad hoc feedback to Microsoft teams, such as the Internet Explorer team.

== See also ==
- LinkedIn Learning
