= GMER =

Software tool for detecting and removing rootkits on Microsoft Windows

- Stable release: 2.2.19882 / March 11, 2016; 9 years ago
- Operating system: Windows
- Type: Utility software
- License: Freeware
- Website: www.gmer.net

GMER is a software tool written by a Polish researcher Przemysław Gmerek, for detecting and removing rootkits. It runs on Microsoft Windows and has support for Windows NT, 2000, XP, Vista, 7, 8 and 10. With version 2.0.18327 full support for Windows x64 is added.

At the time of first release in 2004, it introduced innovative rootkit detection techniques and quickly gained popularity for its effectiveness. It was incorporated into a few antivirus tools including Avast antivirus and SDFix.

For several months in 2006 and 2007, the tool's website was the target of heavy DDoS attacks attempting to block its downloads.
