= Laptop theft =

Taking another person's laptop without their permission or consent

Laptop theft (or notebook theft) is a significant threat to users of laptop computers. Many methods to protect the data and to prevent theft have been developed, including alarms, laptop locks, and visual deterrents such as stickers or labels. Victims of laptop theft can lose hardware, software, and essential data that has not been backed up. Thieves also may have access to sensitive data and personal information. Some systems authorize access based on credentials stored on the laptop including MAC addresses, web cookies, cryptographic keys and stored passwords.

== Analysis ==
According to the Federal Bureau of Investigation (FBI), losses from laptop theft totaled more than $3.5 million in 2005. The Computer Security Institute/FBI Computer Crime & Security Survey found that the theft of a laptop costed companies, on average, $31,975. In a study published by Intel in 2010 surveying 329 private and public organizations, 7.1% of employee laptops were lost or stolen before the end of their usefulness lifespan. Furthermore, it was determined that the average total negative economic impact of a stolen laptop was $49,256. The total cost of lost laptops to all organizations involved in the study was estimated at $2.1 billion. Of the $48B lost from the U.S. economy as a result of data breaches, 28% resulted from stolen laptops or other portable devices.

In the 2011, Bureau Brief prepared by the NSW Bureau of Crime Statistics and Research it was reported that thefts of laptops have been on the increase over the last 10 years, attributed in part by an increase in ownership but also because they are an attractive proposition for thieves and opportunists. In 2001 2,907 laptops were stolen from New South Wales dwellings, but by 2010 this had risen to 6,492, second only to cash of items taken by thieves. The Bureau reports that one in four break-ins in 2010 resulted in a laptop being stolen. This startling trend in burglaries lends itself to an increase in identity theft and fraud due to the personal and financial information commonly found on laptops. These statistics do not take into account unreported losses so the figures could arguably be much higher.

Businesses have much to lose if an unencrypted or poorly secured laptop is misappropriated, yet many do not adequately assess this risk and take appropriate action. Loss of sensitive company information is of significant risk to all businesses and measures should be taken to adequately protect this data. A survey conducted in multiple countries suggested that employees are often careless or deliberately circumvent security procedures, which leads to the loss of the laptop. According to the survey, employees were most likely to lose a laptop while travelling at hotels, airports, rental cars, and conference events.

Behling and Wood examined the issue of laptop security and theft. Their survey of employees in southern New England highlighted that not only were security measures fundamentally basic but that training employees in security measures was limited and inadequate.

- 100% of the surveyed employees had access to company information via a laptop from remote sites that included their own homes.
- 78% were authorized to store company data on their laptop.
- 36% of businesses did not provide security training.

They concluded that trends in laptop thefts needed to be monitored to assess what intervention measures were required.

== Inside protection ==
Passwords are no longer adequate to protect laptops. There are many solutions that can improve the strength of a laptop's protection. Full disk encryption (FDE) is an increasingly popular and cost-effective approach. There are a number of tools available, both commercial and open source that enable a user to circumvent passwords for Windows, Mac OS X, and Linux. One example is TrueCrypt which allows users to create a virtual encrypted disk on their computer.

== Physical protection ==
A number of computer security measures have emerged that aim at protecting data. The Kensington Security Slot along with a locking cable provides physical security against thefts of opportunity. This is a cord that is attached to something heavy that cannot be moved, and is then locked into the case of the laptop, but this is not 100% secure.

The Noble security lock slot is a different way to attach a security cable.

== Major laptop thefts ==
In 2006 a laptop in custody of a data analyst was stolen that contained personal and health data of about 26.5 million active duty troops and veterans. The agency has estimated that it will cost between $100 million to $500 million to prevent and cover possible losses from the data theft. In 2007, the United States Department of Veterans Affairs agreed to pay $20 million to current and former military personnel to settle a class action lawsuit.

In 2007 the Financial Services Authority (FSA) fined the UK's largest building society, Nationwide, £980,000 for inadequate procedures when an employee's laptop was stolen during a domestic burglary. The laptop had details of 11 million customers' names and account numbers and, whilst the device was password protected, the information was unencrypted. The FSA noted that the systems and controls fell short, given that it took the Nationwide three weeks to take any steps to investigate the content on the missing laptop. The substantial fine was invoked to reinforce the FSA's commitment to reducing financial crime.

=== Common locations ===
LoJack for Laptops has compiled a list of the top ten places from which laptops are stolen, including schools and airports.

To provide some context, the Ponemon Institute released a study that indicates over 600,000 laptops will be lost or stolen at US airports every year, with 65–69% of them remaining unclaimed.

== See also ==
- Device tracking software
- IT risk
- Pre-boot authentication
- Prey (software)
