= NTFSDOS =

- Developer(s): Winternals
- Stable release: 3.02R (read-only) / June 26, 2001; 23 years ago
- Operating system: DOS
- Type: Utility software
- License: Freeware
- Website: A mirror of the original page

NTFSDOS Tools
- Developer(s): Winternals
- Stable release: 2.0 / 2001; 24 years ago
- Operating system: DOS
- Type: Utility software
- License: Retail software
- Website: None

NTFSDOS Professional
- Developer(s): Winternals
- Stable release: 4.01 / February 28, 2002; 23 years ago
- Operating system: Microsoft Windows (for installation), DOS (for main utilities)
- Type: Utility software
- License: Demoware
- Website: A mirror of the original page

NTFSDOS were three kinds of programs by Winternals (later bought by Microsoft) for DOS that could handle NTFS formatted drives.

== Programs ==
=== Basic ===
The first program was NTFSDOS - a freeware utility for DOS (NTFSDOS.EXE) that allows read-only access to NTFS formatted drives from a DOS environment.

=== Tools ===
The second program was NTFSDOS Tools - an add-on package for NTFSDOS that contains two commercial utilities for DOS - NTFSCopy and NTFSRen. The former (NTFSCOPY.EXE) could be used to overwrite corrupt files with fresh versions. The latter (NTFSREN.EXE) could be used to change the names of bad drivers so Windows could not load them.

=== Professional ===
The final program was NTFSDOS Professional - a whole commercial solution for handling read and write operations in NTFS from a DOS environment. It must be installed as a package for Microsoft Windows first.

The downloaded version comes in demoware form. The user can only use the package in read-only mode in order to evaluate it.

== Discontinuation ==
Winternals was acquired by Microsoft on July 18, 2006, which discontinued NTFSDOS.
