= Bringrr =

Bringr (Pairable)
- Type: Private
- Industry: Consumer electronics
- Founded: 2009
- Founder: James Logan, Chairman; Asheem Aggarwal, CEO
- Headquarters: Boston, Massachusetts, United States
- Products: Bringrr; BringTag

Bringrr is a startup company that develops and manufactures electronic tracking systems for commonly used items, including smartphones. The company was founded in 2009 by James Logan. The company's eponymous product is a device that alerts users if they do not have their smartphone when they start their car. Asheem Aggarwal is Bringrr's CEO.

== History ==
Bringrr was founded by James Logan in 2009 to produce and market Bringrr Reminder (later renamed Bringrr), a cylindrical device that plugs into a car's cigarette lighter and alerts users when the device does not detect the user's smartphone inside the car. At the time Logan, a former co-founder of Microtouch Systems and Gotuit, served as CEO. The company was incubated by Amoskeag Business Incubator in Manchester, New Hampshire and later moved to DifferenceMaker, a startup development program housed at the University of Massachusetts Lowell. The company moved to Boston in 2014.

The company began prototyping Bringrr in October 2012. Aldo Beqiraj, an electrical engineering student at the University of Massachusetts Lowell, was hired as Bringrr's CMO in September 2013. Beqiraj became Bringrr CEO in January 2014. Bringrr successfully completed a $75,000 Kickstarter campaign later that month. In the Fall of 2014, Asheem Aggarwal became CEO of Bringrr, and changed the name to Pairable.

== Products ==
Bringrr's products are Bringrr, a cylindrical device that plugs into a car's cigarette lighter and links with the user's mobile devices, and BringTags, a bluetooth low energy beacon that attaches to common items and pets. BringTags interface with the Bringrr app and sends notifications to the user's phone when tagged items are lost or left behind.

To date no product has been delivered by the Indiegogo campaign nor the Kickstarter campaign.

In July 2015, Bringr opened for pre-orders on amazon.
