= Device tracking software =

Software for remotely monitoring the location of electronic devices

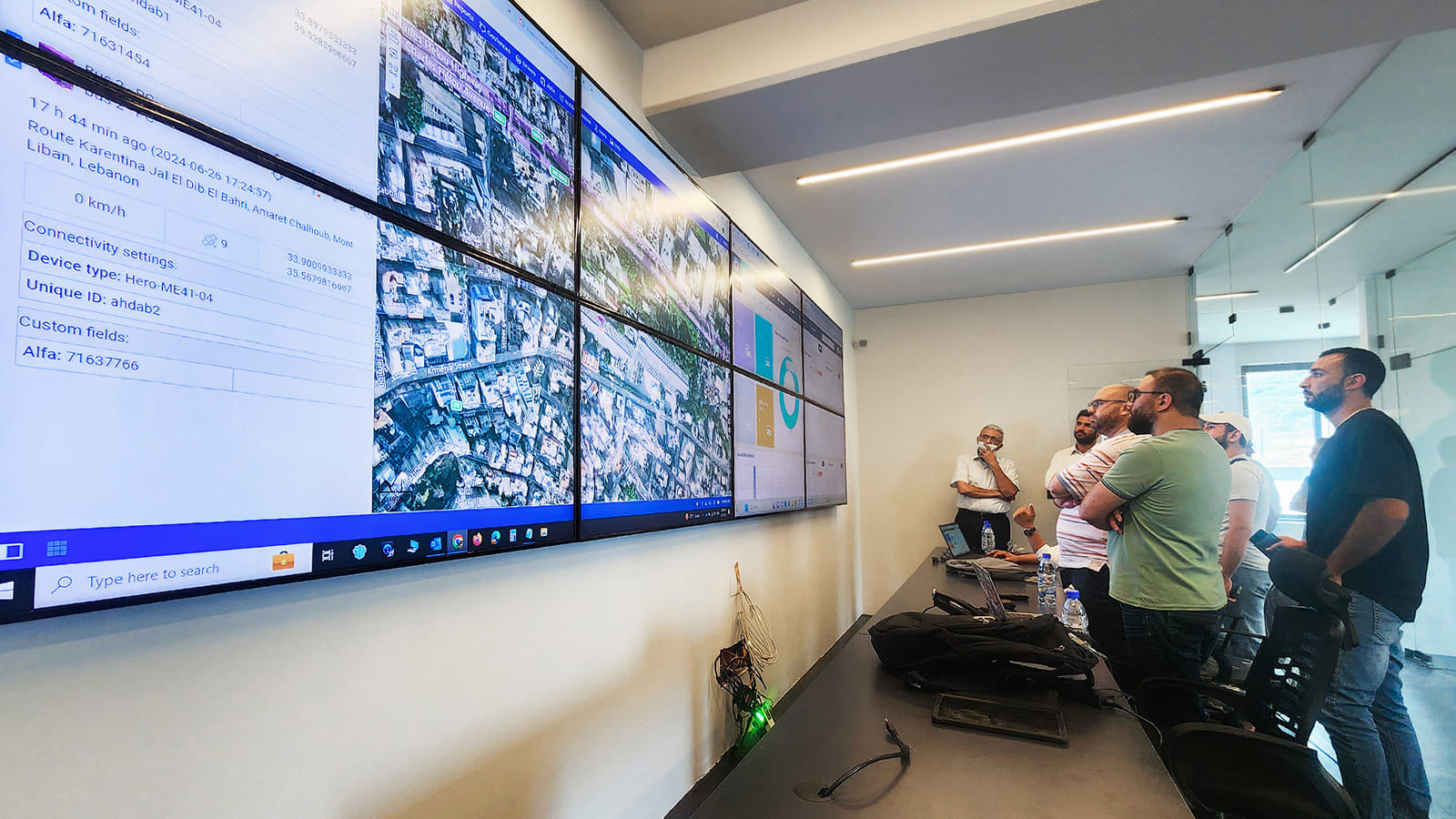
A transport control room where staff monitor a vehicle fleet in real-time.

Device tracking software is a type of software that allows a user to monitor the real-time or historical location of an electronic device, and by extension, the person or item carrying it. The system typically consists of two main parts: a client-side application or agent installed on the device to be tracked, and a server-side platform that receives, processes, and displays the location data to the user.

The software on the device obtains its location using various technologies, including GPS, Wi-Fi positioning, or cellular network triangulation, and transmits this location data to the server. This technology is the foundation for a wide range of applications, from consumer services for finding lost or stolen devices to enterprise platforms for fleet management and employee monitoring. The overall solution is a type of tracking system that is integral to modern telematics.

Key features often include:

- Real-time location tracking
- Remote locking and wiping
- Geofencing alerts
- Usage monitoring

Common uses:

- Finding lost or stolen devices
- Parental controls
- Fleet management for businesses
- Employee monitoring

Some cell phones and other devices come bundled with asset tracking software such as Find My (Apple devices) and Find Hub (Android).

Device tracking becomes significantly more challenging, and often nearly impossible, when the device's data connection is turned off.

This is because;

1. No GPS transmission: Without a data connection, the device can't send its GPS coordinates to tracking servers.
2. Cell tower triangulation fails: The device can't communicate with cell towers, preventing network-based location.
3. Wi-Fi positioning disabled: Without data, the device can't transmit information about nearby Wi-Fi networks.
4. IP tracking ineffective: No internet connection means no IP address to trace.
5. Background services halted: Tracking apps can't run or update in the background without data.
6. Remote commands blocked: Users can't send remote lock or wipe commands to a device without data.

In these cases, the last known location before data was turned off becomes crucial. Some tracking methods might still work if the device reconnects briefly, but continuous real-time tracking is essentially impossible without an active data connection.

== See also ==
- Geolocation software
- Hybrid positioning system
- Mobile phone tracking
- Bringrr
- Skyhook Wireless
- Laptop theft
- Prey (software)
