= Prey (software) =

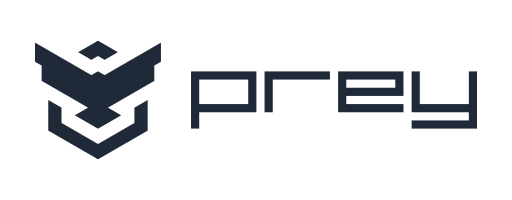
- Developer: Prey Inc.
- Initial release: March 24, 2009
- Stable release: 1.9.3
- Operating system: Windows, Linux, OS X, Android, iOS
- Type: Device tracking software
- License: GNU General Public License; proprietary (Prey Pro)
- Website: preyproject.com

Prey is a software and online platform for mobile device tracking, management, and protection available for laptops, tablets, and mobiles. The software and service is developed by the Chilean company Prey Inc., successor of the funding company Fork Ltd.

Prey was originally created by the developer Tomás Pollak who together with Carlos Yaconi, the current CEO of the company, founded Fork Ltd. and released the first version of Prey for Linux.

== Functioning ==
Prey started as an anti-theft software for recovering lost mobile devices which evolved into remote management with device and data protection. The service works through a client, or application, installed on the devices that are to be protected.

== Company ==
Prey Inc. is a private software development company. Currently, it operates offices in San Francisco and in Santiago de Chile.

=== Features ===
The main feature in the platform is location tracking for any of the supported devices, with active monitoring of device movement. The service also has automatic reactions to location triggers, such as unwanted movements, that trigger security actions instantly when the event is detected.

- Provides a set of features that give the user remote security capabilities in case of theft or loss.
- Remotely recover or wipe information from a lost or stolen devices.
- Tools that streamline management processes and maintain a device inventory for global monitoring.
- Evidence generation tool for device recovery.

== Source code ==
The source code in Prey's agents, or applications, is open source code under the GNU General Public License (GPLv3). The online platform's code and infrastructure are private and property of Prey Inc.

== Versions ==
The first version of the agent was released originally for Linux and Mac OS X in March 2009 and for Microsoft Windows in April 2009. Currently, Prey is available for laptops, tablets and mobiles in the macOS, Windows, Linux, Android, and iOS operating systems.
