= Fresco (disambiguation) =

Fresco is a painting technique.

Fresco may also refer to:

- Adobe Fresco, digital painting software
- Fresco (surname)
- "Fresco", the NATO reporting name for the Soviet Mikoyan-Gurevich MiG-17 and Polish PZL-Mielec Lim-6
- Fresco (Stockhausen), a 1969 orchestral composition by Karlheinz Stockhausen
- Fresco (Lindberg), a 1997 orchestral composition by Magnus Lindberg
- Fresco (web browser) a proprietary, embedded web browser for RISC OS and embedded platforms
- The Fresco, a 2000 book by Sheri S. Tepper
- Fresco (board game), 2010 game
- Fresco (M People album), 1997
- Fresco (Jerry Rivera album), 1996
- Fresco EP, a 1983 EP by Icehouse
- Fresco, Ivory Coast, a town
- Fresco River, a river in Brazil

== See also ==
- Fresca, a brand of soft drink
- Al fresco dining
- Frisco (disambiguation)
