= Alex van Someren =

British computing entrepreneur and venture capitalist

- Born: February 1965 (age 61); Boston, Massachusetts, United States
- Education: King's College School, Cambridge
- Occupations: Computer entrepreneur and venture capitalist
- Known for: Founding the hardware encryption company nCipher
- Spouse: Carol Atack

Alexander Rupert van Someren (born February 1965) is a British computing entrepreneur and venture capitalist, best known for founding the hardware encryption company nCipher in 1996 with his brother Nicko van Someren. He served as Chief Scientific Adviser for National Security between July 2021 and March 2025, succeeding Anthony Finkelstein, and was succeeded by Danielle George from April 2025.

== Education and early life ==
Van Someren was born in Boston, Massachusetts, United States in February 1965, the son of Laurence ("Laurie") van Someren, a metallurgist and pioneer of biofeedback devices.

The family moved back to England in 1971, to the village of Bottisham just outside Cambridge, and van Someren was educated at King's College School in Cambridge and then Eton College, where his father had previously also been a pupil.

== Career ==
Whilst still at school van Someren took summer jobs with Acorn Computers, contributing software for the Acorn Atom and Acorn Eurocard System machines, and then helping debug the BASIC interpreter and machine operating system of the pre-production BBC micro. On leaving school at 17 he went to work for Acorn full time for two years, where duties included inducting new service engineers into the detailed hardware design and quirks of the machine. Then, setting up as an independent computer consultant in London, he worked for clients including Autocue, who he helped to create their first teleprompter system that was all-digital rather than based on a scroll of paper, based on a modified BBC Master computer, and wrote articles for various Acorn-related magazines including Acorn User.

With the launch of the ARM3 processor in 1989, van Someren saw a business opportunity, and began selling drop-in processor upgrade cards to owners of Acorn Archimedes computers to replace their existing ARM2 chips, allowing them to take advantage of the higher clock speed and on-die memory cache of the ARM3. (See Acorn Archimedes§ARM3 upgrades). Sales were routed through his father's existing Aleph One biofeedback equipment small business, because "dad already had a credit card machine". Intel x86 coprocessor cards followed, allowing users to switch between Archimedes and PC compatible software in the one machine, and ultimately to natively run Windows software in a window of the system's native RISC OS.

A 1992 expansion into selling Ethernet cards led van Someren and his brother Nicko, along with two friends, to found ANT to build networking hardware. While with ANT, Nicko wrote the first version of the Fresco web browser which helped the company move from being primarily a hardware company to a software company. Fresco became the standard web-browsing software for the ARM architecture, finding its way into network computers and set-top boxes. van Someren ran the company as CEO until 1996, when he handed its day-to-day running to new management, although he continued to be a director until 2000. ANT went public on the London Alternative Investments Market in March 2005. In February 2013 ANT was acquired by Espial Group.

Logo of nCipher

The introduction of Secure Sockets Layer (SSL) by Netscape in 1995/96 to secure online transactions added a huge burden onto existing web servers. Backed by an initial £1 million in capital from Terry Matthews, van Someren and his brother Nicko co-founded nCipher to build high speed cryptographic accelerators and hardware security modules, based initially on clusters of ARM chips. As before, Alex took on the business side, leading on strategic planning, sales, negotiation, and organisation, while Nicko got "deeply technical" driving the engineering. nCipher went public on the London Stock Exchange in October 2000, at the time valuing the company at around £450 million. In October 2008 nCipher was acquired by Thales Group. The unit was sold again and merged into Entrust in June 2019, a regulatory compliance requirement for the acquisition by Thales of digital security company Gemalto.

A short period followed the sale of nCipher with van Someren consulting for the UK Government's Trade Department (UKTI)'s Global Entrepreneur Programme, during which he helped define the structure of the UK Entrepreneur Visa (since discontinued).

In October 2010 van Someren then joined Amadeus Capital Partners, the venture capital firm founded by Hermann Hauser and Anne Glover, serving as managing partner for seed funds (until 2013) and then early stage funds (to 2021).

Van Someren was appointed Chief Scientific Adviser for National Security in July 2021, succeeding Anthony Finkelstein.

== Honours and awards ==
Van Someren was made an honorary professor of Computer Science in the University of Manchester in November 2020. In 2022 he was elected a Fellow of the Royal Academy of Engineering.

== Personal life ==
Van Someren is married to the classicist Carol Atack, who is a Fellow and Director of Studies in Classics at Newnham College, Cambridge, and also a syndic of the Fitzwilliam Museum. The couple live in Cambridge and have three children.

Van Someren and Atack together wrote The ARM RISC Chip - A Programmers Guide (Addison-Wesley, 1993). Atack also wrote the documentation manuals for the Aleph One Archimedes expansion boards. According to her Mastodon profile, she still follows the tech world.
