= Pinpoint =

Pinpoint or pin point may refer to:

- Pinpoint citation
- Pin-point method (ecology)
- Microsoft Pinpoint
- Pinpoint Oxford
- Pinpoint pupil
- Pinpoint a.k.a. waypoint
- Pin Point, Georgia, an unincorporated community in Chatham County, Georgia, U.S.A.

== See also ==
- Point of interest
