= Flintoft =

Flintoft is a surname. Notable people with the surname include:

- Joseph Flintoft Berry (1856–1931), Canadian Bishop
- Luke Flintoft (1680–1727), English composer
- William Flintoft (1890–1951), Australian rules football player

== See also ==
- Flintoff
