= Itmagination =

Polish IT company

Coordinates: 52°13′37.0″N 20°59′36.5″E

ITMAGINATION
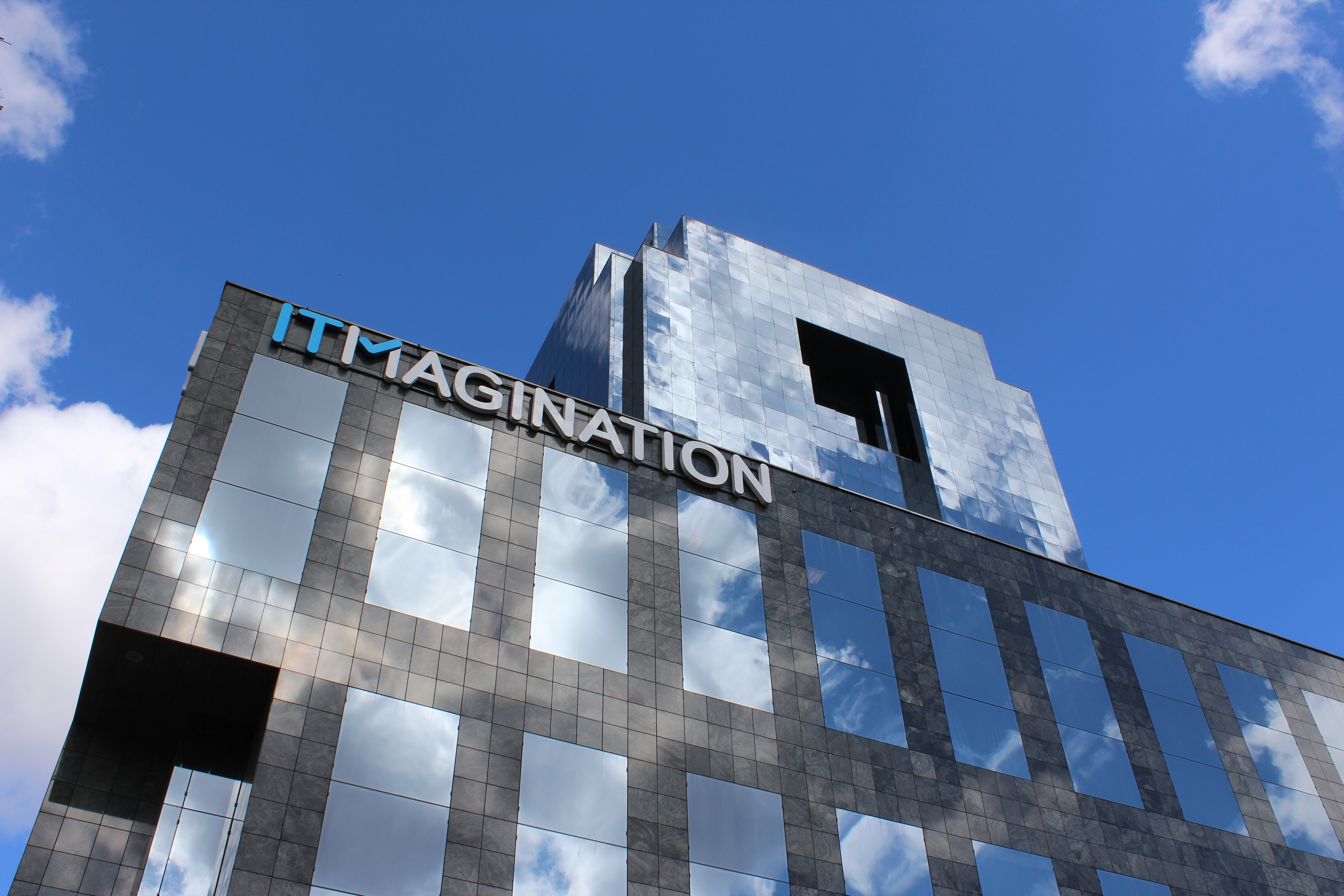
- Company type: Private limited company
- Industry: Software development; Information technology; Software design; Business intelligence; IT outsourcing
- Founded: 9 September 2008; 17 years ago
- Founder: Daniel Arak, Dawid Łaziński, Łukasz Kieloch
- Headquarters: Prosta 32, Warsaw, Poland
- Number of locations: 5 offices (2019)
- Area served: Worldwide
- Key people: Daniel Arak, Dawid Łaziński, Paweł Borowski (shareholders)
- Number of employees: ▲450 (2022)
- Website: www.itmagination.com

Itmagination (styled as ITMAGINATION) is a Polish IT company, founded in 2008. Warsaw-based, it has an additional office in the Polish city of Kraków.

== Company ==
Itmagination was founded on 9 September 2008 by Daniel Arak, Dawid Łaziński and Łukasz Kieloch. Headquartered in Warsaw, it has an office in Kraków as well. In 2016, it established a bureau in Boston, MA, in 2016. In 2013, Arak, Łaziński, Kieloch and Paweł Borowski founded ITM Outsourcing (ITMO) to focus specifically on IT outsourcing. In 2016, they merged both companies under the Itmagination brand.

Itmagination provides technology solutions in sectors such as financial services, development of custom software, Business Intelligence solutions, IT outsourcing, data management and data analysis services, machine learning. It develops custom software solutions and provides application migration, application integration, application management/maintenance and application lifecycle services.

Between 2011 and 2014, the company had a growth in revenues of 530%. The number of its employees has grown from 180 in 2014, through 280 in 2015, to 450 in 2019.

Itmagination's first client was Bayer. Currently, it is an official partner of companies such as Google, IBM, Microsoft and Oracle. In 2012, Itmagination became Partner of the Year by Microsoft in Poland, acquiring seven gold and two silver Microsoft Certified Partner certifications.

In 2020, ITMAGINATION accomplished the first acquisition in history, taking over Maise from Kraków, which creates mobile interfaces and provides UI/UX services. Thanks to this investment, the company was able to broaden its service portfolio of user interface and user experience design. ITMAGINATION did not disclose the value of the transaction.

== Awards and accolades ==
In 2015, 2016 and 2017, Itmagination received the Gazela Biznesu (Business Gazelle) award by Puls Biznesu daily for the most-dynamically growing small and medium-sized companies in Poland.

In 2016, Itmagination has been recognised by Deloitte as one of the fastest-growing technology companies in Central Europe. The company has appeared on the Deloitte Technology Fast 50 list, the "Rising Stars" category. In 2012, it was ranked 8th, and, in 2013, 5th. In 2014 and 2015, it was among Technology Fast 50.

In 2017, Itmagination was featured on the FT1000 list among the fastest-growing companies in Europe.

In 2019, the company was selected by Finovate Europe, London, as one of 65 companies that specialize in technology solutions for financial institutions.
