= Mapilab =

MAPILab
- Company type: LLC
- Founded: 2003
- Headquarters: Vilnius, Lithuania
- Products: Microsoft Outlook Add-ins, MAPILab Statistics for Microsoft SharePoint, Software for Microsoft Exchange Server, Groupware Solutions, Microsoft Excel Add-ons
- Website: MAPILab.com

MAPILab is a software development company that specializes in message exchange and team collaboration programs. MAPILab has produced software for Microsoft Outlook, Microsoft Exchange Server, Microsoft Office SharePoint Server, and Microsoft Excel among other Microsoft products. The company was founded in 2003 and currently has 30 employees. Being a Microsoft Gold Certified Partner, the MAPILab company receives the pre-release versions of Microsoft products and updates beforehand and have extended access to technical information and support, which allows more time to develop products. All products have a trial version and are available for download from the company website. The quality of the MAPILab products has been certified by Microsoft and VeriTest. Some of them have received MSD2D's People Choice and PC Magazine Best Software awards. The MAPILab products are listed on the Microsoft Office Online and Windows Catalog websites.

== Product lines ==
- Microsoft Outlook Add-ins - More than 20 various add-ins which extend Microsoft Outlook functionality; duplicates elimination, attachment management, and other features.
- Software for Microsoft Exchange Server - Tools for organizations using Microsoft Exchange Server; server-side e-mail sorting rules, POP3 connectors, and reporting solutions.
- Groupware Solutions - Shared folders, folder synchronization, and other features that help to build reliable and low-cost collaboration systems based on Microsoft Outlook.
- MAPILab Statistics for SharePoint - Collects and analyses data about the usage of site collections of the SharePoint product family. The product provides several finished reports both for evaluating the common visiting traffic of sites and for reviewing details such as user sessions and hits.
- Microsoft Excel Add-ons - 7 tools for work automation; duplicate row and cell removal; spreadsheet comparison; broken links fixes, and others.
