= Nicko van Someren =

British computer scientist, cryptographer and entrepreneur

Nicko van Someren FREng
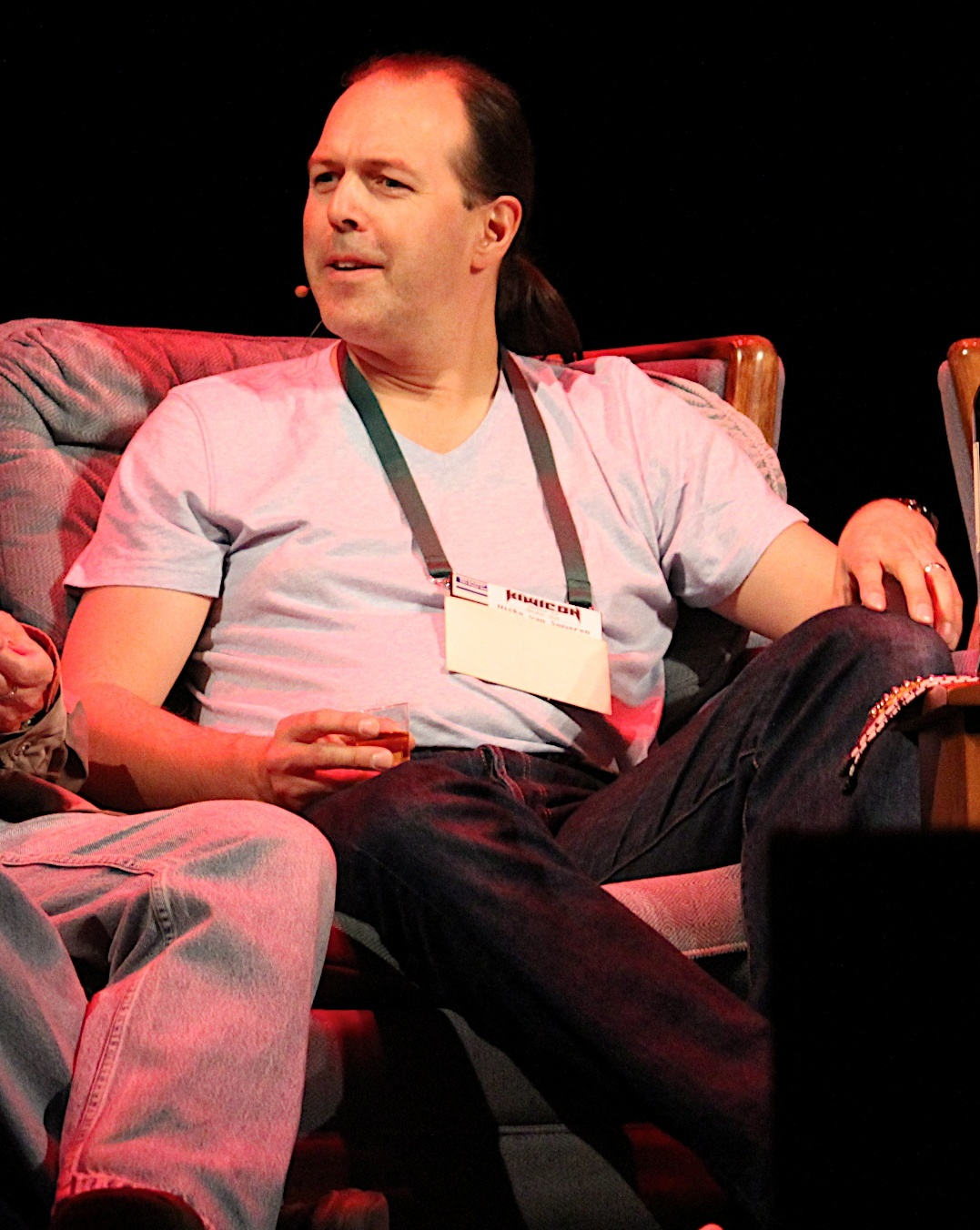
- Nicko van Someren at Kiwicon in Wellington, New Zealand (2012)
- Citizenship: British
- Education: Trinity College, Cambridge
- Scientific career
- Fields: Computer Science
- Doctoral advisor: Neil Wiseman

Nicholas van Someren FREng (born 1967) is a British computer scientist, cryptographer and entrepreneur. He is known for having founded ANT Software, and nCipher, as well as for previous roles as chief security architect at Juniper Networks and chief technology officer at Good Technology and the Linux Foundation, where he ran the Core Infrastructure Initiative. He is currently the chief technology officer at Absolute Security.

== Education and early life ==
Van Someren attended King College Choir School in Cambridge, UK before receiving a scholarship to Oakham School in Rutland. He went on to study as an undergraduate in Computer Science at Trinity College, Cambridge, where he subsequently earned a PhD.

Van Someren credits his interest in business to his father, who ran a business from their home when he was young. While still at school van Someren took summer jobs with Acorn Computers and acquired an interest in cryptography by reading about public key encryption in Scientific American.

== Businesses ==
In 1992 Nicko van Someren and his brother Alex van Someren, along with two friends, founded ANT Software to build networking hardware. While with ANT, van Someren wrote the first version of the Fresco web browser which helped the company move from being primarily a hardware company to a software company. ANT went public on the London Alternative Investments Market in March 2005. In February 2013 ANT was acquired by Espial Group.

Logo of nCipher

In 1996 van Someren, along with his brother Alex co-founded nCipher to build high speed cryptographic accelerators and hardware security modules. nCipher went public on the London Stock Exchange in October 2000, at the time valuing the company at around £450 million. In October 2008 nCipher was acquired by Thales Group.

Van Someren was chief security architect at Juniper Networks, then joined Good Technology as CTO in 2011, and remained with Good until its acquisition by BlackBerry Limited in 2015. He was then appointed to be CTO of the Linux Foundation.

In 2019, van Someren joined Absolute Security as CTO.

== Honours ==
In 2008 van Someren was elected as a Fellow of the Royal Academy of Engineering.

== Work in computer security ==
Van Someren has published numerous papers in the field of computer security. In 1998 he co-authored a paper with Adi Shamir introducing the concept of key finding attacks. A statistical key finding attack was used by van Someren to locate the signature verification keys used by Microsoft to validate the signatures on MS-CAPI plug-ins. One of these key was later discovered to be referred to as the NSAKEY by Microsoft, sparking some controversy.
