= King's College School, Cambridge =

Coordinates: 52.2039°N 0.1065°E

King's College School
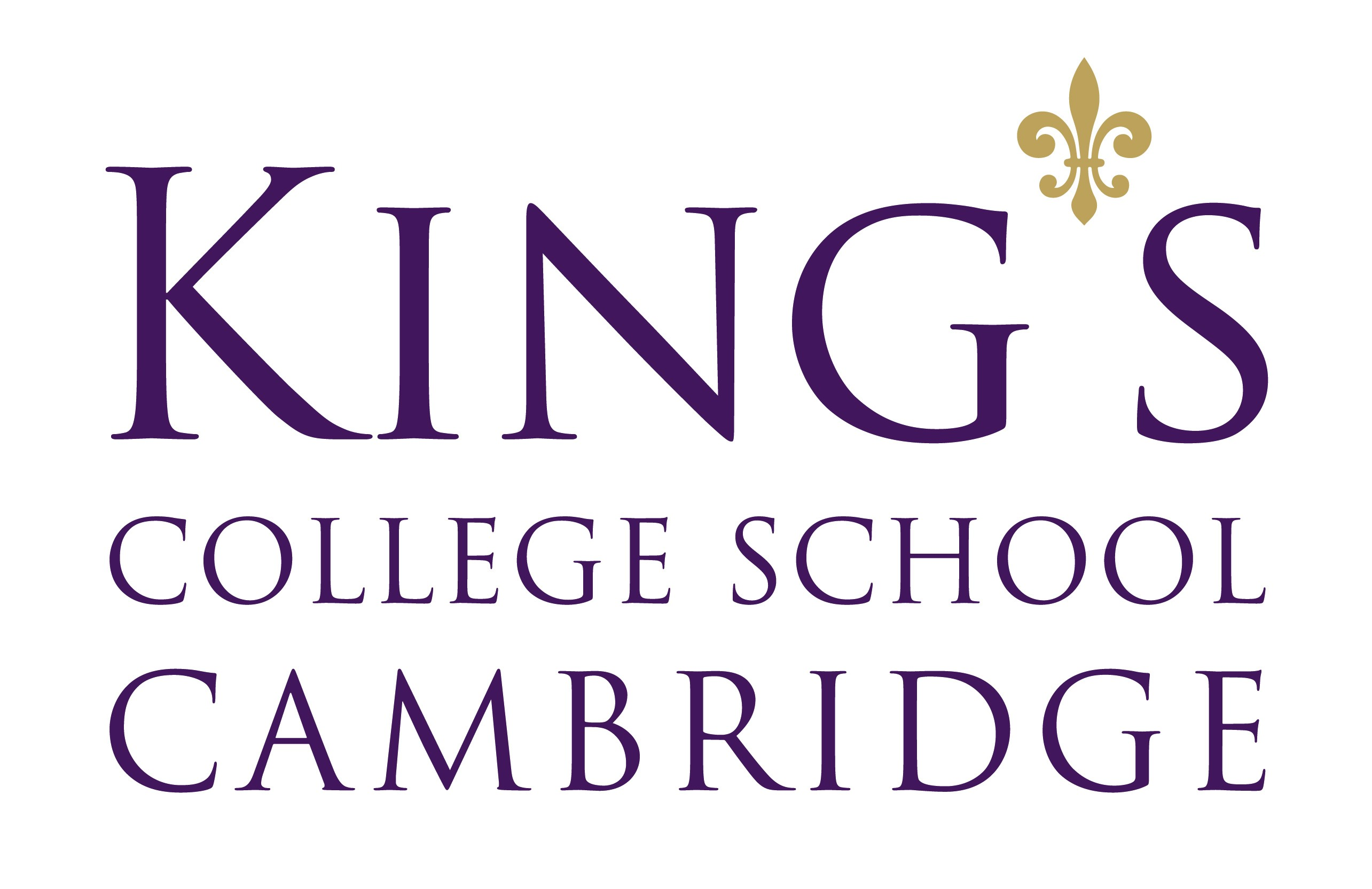

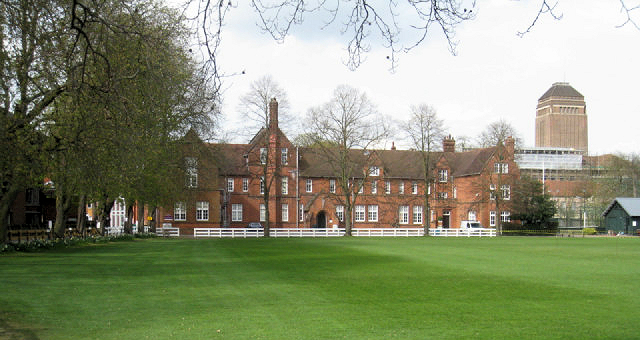

Location
- West Road; Cambridge, Cambridgeshire; England

Information
- Type: Private preparatory day and boarding Choral foundation school
- Religious affiliation: Church of England
- Established: 1441; 585 years ago
- Founder: Henry VI of England
- Department for Education URN: 110911 Tables
- Chair of Governors: The Revd Dr Stephen Cherry
- Head: Yvette Day
- Gender: Co-educational
- Age: 4 to 13
- Enrollment: 420
- Houses: Burrells; Grange; Queens; West
- Colour: Purple
- Publication: The Fleur De Lys (Annual)
- Website: www.kcs.cambs.sch.uk

King's College School is a co-educational preparatory school for pupils aged 4 to 13 in Cambridge, England, situated on West Road off Grange Road, west of the city centre. It was founded specially to educate the choristers in the King's College Choir during the 15th century. Though it is no longer located on College grounds, it remains an integral component of the Chapel's musical tradition and continues to receive governance and financial support from the College. The school is part of the same historic foundation as Eton College. The most recent fully integrated Independent Schools Inspectorate (ISI) inspection graded it "excellent" in all rating categories.

== History ==
King's College was founded in 1441 by Henry VI. By 1447, there was a full complement of 16 choristers singing in the chapel. They were likely educated by a fellow until the appointment of the first Informator Chorustarum (Master over the Choristers) in 1456, Robert Brantham. A Marian visitation of the University in 1557 documented dedicated school rooms, reviewing the 'chorusters chamber and schole' and confiscating books considered unsuitable.

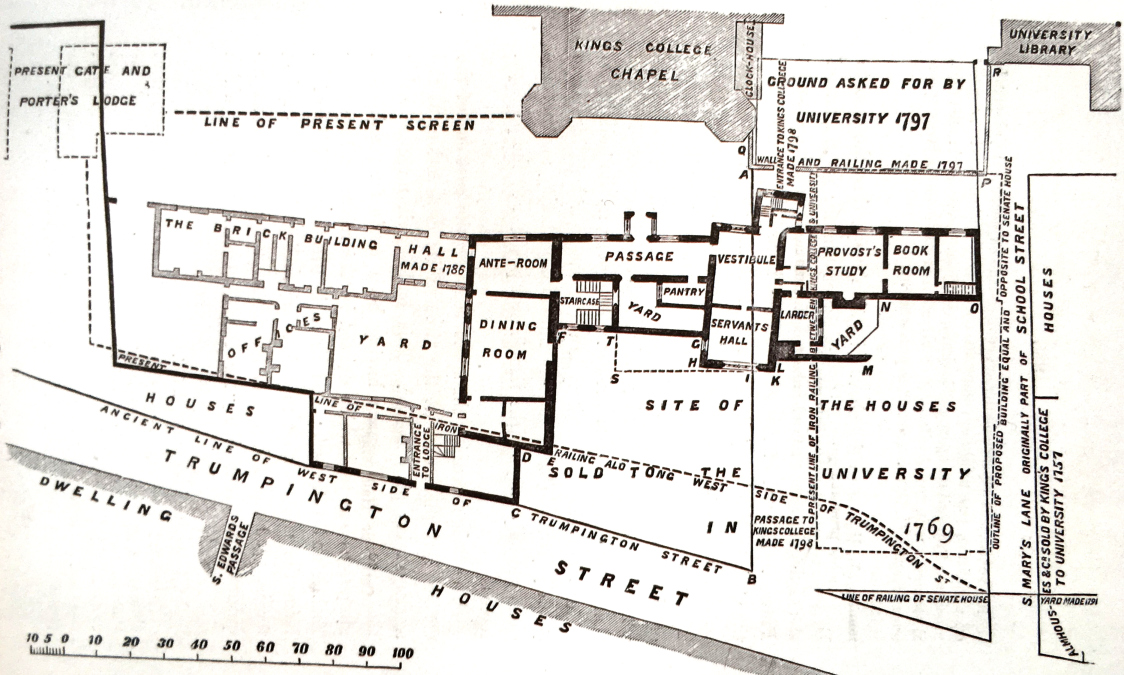
The location of the demolished brick building that housed the choir school in the 18th century

The school has changed locations many times in its history. By 1693, it was located in a building to the south-east of the chapel, adjacent to King's Parade. In this year, that building was demolished and replaced with what was known as the New Brick Building, which continued to house the school through to the nineteenth century. In the 1820s during the rebuilding by William Wilkins, the brick building and adjoining Provost's Lodge were demolished, opening up a view of the chapel from the street. The outline of the foundations of the brick building can be seen on the lawn during long periods of hot, dry weather.

When the Wilkins Building opened in 1828 on the court's south side, opposite the chapel, it accommodated the school in its rooms. By the 1870s, in response to improving musical standards in other English choirs, it was decided to open a boarding house to accommodate choristers from outside Cambridge to widen the field from which the selection of choristers could take place. This was opened on the current site in West Road in 1878, and by 1880 all 16 choristers were boarders, and there were also 8 non-chorister day pupils, a number that would gradually increase over the coming decades. From 1976, girls were admitted, and as enrolment increased, the school opened a pre-preparatory department.

== Boarding ==
The boarding programme is open to boys and girls. Year 4 and 5 Choristers are weekly boarders. Year 6 to 8 Choristers are full boarders, with the option to spend Friday nights at home, returning after lunchtime on Saturday. Other boarders return home for the entire weekend.

== Houses ==
Like many British schools, King's uses a house system. This is not a system related to boarding houses, of which there is only one at King's, but one where pupils are placed into one of four houses, each named after a surrounding road or path. Throughout the year, houses compete in sports and academics, earning merits for victories and good work; these are totaled and averaged each term, and the house with the highest score wins a party.

== Links with other schools ==
The school began a link project with a school in Sri Lanka in 2007 initially as a response to the 2004 Indian Ocean earthquake and tsunami, after a visit there by the then headmaster, Nicholas Robinson, but the link quickly went beyond aid and became more of an academic link, with three yearly teacher exchanges and many more exchanges of work between the schools to learn more about each culture. King's often raises funds to help the school, and has sent musical instruments and sports equipment to the school in Sri Lanka as well.

== Alumni ==
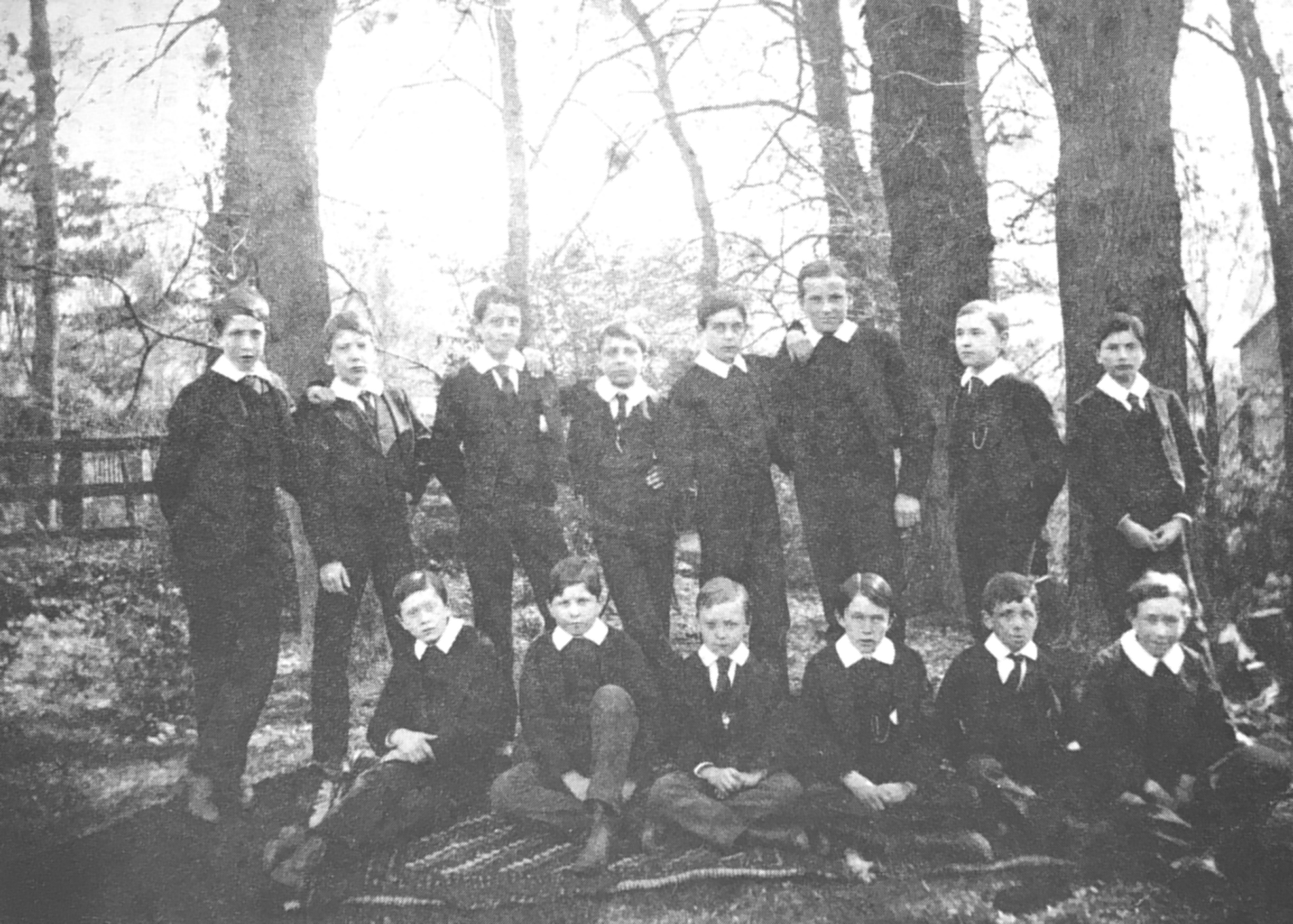
Kings College Choristers 1882

- William Cosyn, Dean of Wells (c. 1470–1525)
- John Hullyer, clergyman burned at the stake on Jesus Green, Cambridge (c. 1520–1556)
- John Cowell, jurist and Master of Trinity Hall (1554–1611)
- Orlando Gibbons, composer (1583–1625)
- Luke Flintoft, clergyman and composer (1680-1727)
- James Essex, architect and builder (1722–1784)
- William Sterndale Bennett composer (1816–1875)
- Francis Newton Parsons, recipient of the Victoria Cross (1875–1900)
- Erasmus Darwin IV, grandson of Charles Darwin (1881–1915)
- Clive Carey, baritone and composer (1883-1968)
- Seiriol Evans, Dean of Gloucester (1894–1984)
- Charles Sorley, war poet (1895–1915)
- Oswin Gibbs-Smith, Dean of Winchester (1901–1969)
- William Oliver, army officer (1901–1981)
- William Baker, Bishop of Zanzibar (1902–1990)
- Donald Harris, Archdeacon of Bedford (1904–1996)
- Michael Ramsey, Archbishop of Canterbury (1904–1988)
- Charles Harvard Gibbs-Smith, aviation historian (1909–1981)
- Michael Clapham, industrialist (1912–2002)
- Hilary Wayment, historian of stained glass (1912-2005)
- Michael Peck, Dean of Lincoln (1914–1968)
- John Cornford, poet and communist, (1915–1936)
- John Frederick Powell, air force officer (1915–2008)
- David Briggs, headmaster King's College School, Cambridge (1917–2020)
- Boris Ford, critic and educationist (1917–1998) (chorister)
- Norman Reddaway, civil servant (1918–1999)
- Wallace Michael Ross, organist (1920–2010)
- Michael Swann, biologist (1920–1990)
- Sir Patrick Howard-Dobson, army officer (1921–2009)
- Evan Luard, politician (1926–1991)
- Fred Tomlinson, singer, songwriter for Monty Python (1927–2016)
- Donald Cameron Watt, historian (1928–2014)
- Elihu Lauterpacht, lawyer (1928–2017)
- John Alldis, conductor (1929–2010)
- John Pardoe, politician (1934–)
- Christopher Tugendhat, Baron Tugendhat, politician (1937–)
- Simon Preston, organist (1938–2022)
- Christopher Bowers-Broadbent, organist (1945–)
- Roy Goodman, conductor (1951–)
- Simon Keynes, Anglo-Saxonist (1952–)
- Hugh Lupton, oral storyteller (1952–)
- David Reddaway, diplomat (1953–)
- Jonathan Willcocks, composer and conductor (1953–) (chorister)
- Andrew Wiles, mathematician who proved Fermat's Last Theorem (1953–)
- Bob Chilcott, composer (1955–) (chorister)
- Amschel Rothschild, businessman (1955–1996)
- Sir Adam Thomson, former British diplomat who served as UK Ambassador to NATO between 2014 and 2016 (1955–)
- Wren Hoskyns, paediatrician (1956–2015)
- Simon McBurney, actor, writer, and director (1957–)
- Quentin Poole, musician (1957–) (chorister)
- Charles Daniels, tenor (1960–)
- Jeremy Northam, actor (1961–)
- Christopher Purves, bass-baritone (1961–)
- Timothy Gowers, Rouse Ball Professor of Mathematics (1963–)
- Richard Farnes, conductor (1964–)
- Jason James, director and expert on UK/Japan relations (1965–) (chorister)
- Alex van Someren, computing entrepreneur (1965–)
- Nicko van Someren, cryptographer and entrepreneur (1967–)
- Ben and Jonathan Finn (1968–), creators of the music software Sibelius
- Olly Smith, wine expert (1974–)
- Julian Huppert, Liberal Democrat politician (1978–)
- Guy Johnston, cellist (1981–) (chorister)
- Ashley Grote, organist (1982–) (chorister)
- Charles C. W. Cooke, journalist and broadcaster (1984–)
- Thomas Ridgewell, YouTube video creator (1990–)

== Heads ==
The following heads of the school have served since 1878, when it moved to its present site in West Road:

- Vincent Charles Reynell 1878–1887
- Benjamin Benham 1887–1905
- Trenham Candy Weatherhead 1905–1912
- Charles Richard Jelf 1912–1927
- Cedric Moulton Fiddian 1927–1950
- Donald George Butters 1950–1958
- Adam Sebastian Arnold-Brown 1958–1959 (interim)
- David Briggs 1959–1977
- Gerald Peacocke 1977–1993
- Andrew Corbett 1993–1998
- Nicholas Robinson 1998–2017
- Tom Hales (acting) 2017
- Yvette Day 2018–

== See also ==
- List of the oldest schools in the United Kingdom
- List of the oldest schools in the world
