= Microsoft Partner Network =

Microsoft Inc.'s partner network

Microsoft Partner Network or MPN, formerly known as the Microsoft Partner Program or MSPP, is Microsoft's partner network which is designed to make resources available to a wide variety of technology companies so they can build a business around Microsoft technologies.

The program consists of 400,000 of partners, vendors and service providers that build or sell services based on Microsoft products as of March 16, 2022. It is difficult to ascertain the exact count, Microsoft blogs and channel magazines in 2017 and 2021 listed 100,000 partners in the US and 30,000 in the UK, but the worldwide number is probably in the millions.

These partners include systems integrators, original equipment manufacturers, independent software vendors, value-added resellers, telecommunications companies, Internet hosting services, marketing agencies, and resellers.

As of 2009, this business ecosystem generated $8.70 in revenue for partner companies for every $1 that Microsoft makes.

== History ==
- Microsoft Certified Solution Provider program was launched in 1992.
- March 2000 – Ian Rogoff was named vice president of Microsoft's Worldwide Partner Group.
- Microsoft Certified Partner program was launched in 2000.
- In 2001, Microsoft decided to invest $500 million in partner-related activities.
- November 2001 – Rosa Garcia replaces Ian Rogoff as head of Microsoft's Worldwide Partner Group.
- 2002 – Allison L. Watson replaced Rosa Garcia as the head of Microsoft's Worldwide Partner Group.
- In 2003, Microsoft invested heavily in the partner program. Microsoft signed up 5,000 new ISVs to the Microsoft's ISV Empower Program. Microsoft upped its number of technical specialists on staff to assist partners, from 700 to 2,400 in one year. Microsoft revamped its employee compensation incentive plans, tying 60 percent of bonuses in most cases to partner and customer satisfaction. Microsoft also centralized its channel programs into the Microsoft Partner Program. This included consolidating OEMs, ISVs, VARs, integrators and consultants under one program.
- 2004 – Microsoft invested $1.7 billion in the partner program.
- July 2010 – John Roskill replaced Allison Watson as the head of Microsoft's Worldwide Partner Group. At that time, Microsoft investment in partners had grown to $5.2 billion. This includes $3.8 billion in channel incentives, $1 billion in partner marketing, $100 million in business investment fund, and $200 million in direct partner benefits through the Microsoft Partner Network.
- Late 2010 – The Microsoft Partner Network officially launched and superseded the old Microsoft Partner Program.
- 2013 – In response to slow sales of the new Windows 8 line, Microsoft slashed Solutions Incentive Program payments.
- Coming August 2019 – On-premises product support will no longer be available for Action Pack and competencies.
- October 2022 – The network was renamed the Microsoft Cloud Partner Program, replacing "Silver" and "Gold" competencies with six Solutions Partner designations.
- July 2023 – The program was again rebranded as the Microsoft AI Cloud Partner Program to focus on integrating artificial intelligence services.

== Current structure ==
Companies can apply to be a Microsoft Certified Partner. Partner resources include the Microsoft Pinpoint online directory, and the annual Microsoft Worldwide Partner Conference.

Other individual certification programs such as the Microsoft Certified Professional are ways for individuals to become professionally certified in Microsoft products.
