= Absolute Security =

American company specializes in endpoint security and cyber resilience

- Type: Private
- Industry: Cybersecurity
- Founded: 1993; 33 years ago
- Headquarters: Seattle, Washington
- Key people: Christy Wyatt (CEO); Saul Gates (CFO); Mark Grace (CRO); Nicholas van Someren (CTO); Ash Parikh (CMO)
- Owner: Crosspoint Capital Partners (2023–present)
- Website: www.absolute.com

Absolute Security is an American company that provides products and services in the fields of cyber resilience, endpoint security, Security Service Edge (SSE), and zero trust security. It was publicly traded company on the Toronto Stock Exchange (TSX) and Nasdaq until it was acquired by Crosspoint Capital Partners in July 2023.

In 2024, the company changed its name to Absolute Security.

The company is headquartered in Seattle, Washington. Regional, global offices are in, Vancouver, British Columbia, Canada, Austin, Texas; Tokyo, Japan; Reading, UK, and Ho Chi Minh City, Vietnam.

== History ==
Founded in 1993 in Vancouver, British Columbia, Canada, by Christian Cotichini and Fraser Cain, Absolute Security developed a product to manage, track and secure computers regardless of the physical location of devices. In 2000, Absolute Security became a publicly traded company on the Toronto Stock Exchange (TSX).

In 2005, Persistence technology patented by Absolute Security was embedded for the first time into the firmware or BIOS of Personal Computers (PCs). This was the start of an ongoing partnership with most major original equipment manufacturers (OEMs) where Absolute Security technology ships with the hardware from the factory.

In 2007, Microsoft awarded Absolute Security gold certified partner status in the Microsoft Partner Ecosystem.

Absolute Security's office in Europe was first established in November 2006, in Newbury, UK. In July 2009, a second regional office was opened in Austin, Texas, to serve as a base for the company's U.S.-based sales team.

In December 2009, Absolute Security announced its acquisition of the LANrev product suite, a computer systems management software application, from Pole Position Software. Following the acquisition, the product suite was rebranded as Absolute Asset Management, and eventually renamed as Absolute Manage.

In November 2012, Absolute Security acquired the assets of LiveTime Software, a privately held helpdesk and IT Service Support Management (ITSSM) provider. LiveTime assets were officially relaunched as part of Absolute Security's expanded product suite in January 2013 as Absolute Service, an IT Service Management (ITSM) tool. Absolute Service received PinkVERIFY ITIL 3 Certification from Pink Elephant.

In June 2013, Absolute Security acquired Palisade Systems, a privately-held provider of data loss prevention (DLP) technologies. In October, the firm launched a student and device protection initiative called Absolute Safe Schools, which educates students and staff of participating schools on the safe use of mobile devices and provides assistance in the event of device loss and theft.

In December 2013, John Livingston stepped down as chief executive officer and as a member of the board of directors at Absolute Security. On June 13, 2014, Geoff Haydon was appointed CEO and director .

Absolute Security renamed Computrace to Data and Device Security (DDS) and refocused its business model in 2015. The company sold its Absolute Manage and Absolute Service products to HEAT Software in October 2015.

On November 2, 2018, Christy Wyatt was appointed CEO and President. She was named “New CEO of the Year” by the Globe and Mail in 2020. Business and technology news organizations have interviewed Wyatt on cyber security topics including ransomware, the zero trust security model, and the trend toward remote work during the COVID-19 pandemic.

In May 2023, Absolute Security announced it would be acquired by Crosspoint Capital Partners for $657 million. The acquisition was completed in July 2023, and the company (ticker symbol ABST) delisted from both the TSX and NASDAQ exchanges.

In 2024, Absolute announced that the company would be changing its name to Absolute Security to more accurately represent the company’s 30-year presence providing cybersecurity and cyber resilience to global organizations.

In September 2024, Absolute Security announced the acquisition of Syxsense, an endpoint and vulnerability management provider based in Costa Mesa, CA.

In June 2026, Absolute Security Zero Trust technology was recognized in Gartner’s Hype Cycles for Workspace Security and Private Networks for Industry.

In March 2026, the company released its annual Cyber Resilience Risk Index.

== Products and services ==
The Absolute Security Cyber Resilience Platform, formerly known as Data and Device Security (embedded into firmware of most computers, tablets, and smartphones at the factory), consists of several components organized into two product lines: Secure Endpoint and Secure Access. Secure Endpoint enables users to monitor and fix PC security and software failures, and identify and patch vulnerabilities. Secure Access provides network connectivity for users to gain secure, compliant, zero trust access to resources in the cloud, private data centers, or on-premises assets.

In 2005, the United States Patent Office recognized the company's Persistence(R) technology and its ability to connect to, track, control, repair, and delete PCs it is embedded and activated through a tamper resistant remote connection.

== Partnerships ==
Absolute Security has partnerships with various (OEMs) worldwide, embedding its Persistence technology directly into device firmware during production. Notable OEM partners include Dell, Lenovo, Hewlett-Packard, and Samsung. Dell, an early customer of the company, later became a supplier. Kevin Peesker, President of Dell Canada, noted that Dell's scalable infrastructure has supported Absolute Security's global growth and operational efficiency from its Vancouver base.

Absolute Security has partnerships with resellers, distributors, and regional partners, including companies such as CDW, PCM, Insight, and InTechnology.

In addition, Absolute Security collaborates with operating system providers, chipset manufacturers, and security companies to develop complementary technologies and services. Other alliance partners include Advanced Micro Devices (AMD), Qualcomm, Verizon, and Follett.
