= Flintoff =

Flintoff is a surname. Notable people with the surname include:

- Andrew Flintoff (born 1977), English cricketer
- Corey Flintoff (born 1946), American newscaster
- Debbie Flintoff-King (born 1960), Australian hurdler
- Rocky Flintoff (born 2008), English cricketer
- Tess Flintoff (born 2003), Australian cricketer

== See also ==
- Flintoft
