= HEAT LANrev =

System administration software

Ivanti LANrev
- Developer: Ivanti
- Stable release: 7.4.5 / September 8, 2019
- Operating system: Windows, macOS
- Type: Network management, Systems management, IT automation, Software Asset Management, Mobile Device Management
- License: Proprietary
- Website: ivanti.com

HEAT LANrev (formerly Absolute Manage) is systems lifecycle management software used by system administrators to automate IT administration tasks. The product includes server and client ("agent") software that runs on Windows and macOS.

== History ==
Absolute Security acquired LANrev from Pole Position Software in December 2009, for US$12.1 million in cash and 500,000 shares of the company's common stock. LANrev was rebranded as Absolute Manage in February 2010. In July 2015, Absolute announced its intention to divest Absolute Manage. The sale of Absolute Manage to HEAT Software was completed on October 5, 2015, for US$11.0 million, and the product was renamed HEAT LANrev.

== School webcam controversy ==
In the 2010 Robbins v. Lower Merion School District case, plaintiffs charged two suburban Philadelphia high schools secretly spied on students by surreptitiously and remotely activating webcams embedded in school-issued laptops the students were using at home, and therefore infringed on their privacy rights. The schools admitted to secretly snapping over 66,000 webshots and screenshots, including webcam shots of students in their bedrooms.

LANrev software was used in the Lower Merion school district's student laptop program, overseen by network technician Michael Perbix. In February 2010, Perbix and other administrators in the district were accused of using the software to take undisclosed and unauthorized photographs of students through the webcams on their Macintosh laptops. The lawsuit was brought by the parents of 15-year-old sophomore, Blake Robbins, who was allegedly accused of illicit behavior seen through his computer's webcam of him in his bedroom. The photographs, taken from a laptop that was not reported stolen, were then allegedly used as evidence in a disciplinary action. The FBI investigated the incident, and a Philadelphia federal judge intervened to sort out issues relating to the lawsuit.

Perbix had previously praised Theft Track, the name of the feature that lets administrators remotely photograph potential thieves if a computer is reported stolen, noting in a YouTube video he produced that:

It’s an excellent feature. Yes, we have used it, and yes, it has gleaned some results for us. But it, in and of itself, is just a fantastic feature for trying to—especially when you’re in a school environment and you have a lot of laptops and you’re worried about, you know, laptops getting up and missing. I’ve actually had some laptops we thought were stolen which actually were still in a classroom, because they were misplaced, and by the time we found out they were back, I had to turn the tracking off. And I had, you know, a good twenty snapshots of the teacher and students using the machines in the classroom.

LANrev's new owner, Absolute Security denounced the use of their software for any illegal purpose, emphasizing that theft recovery should be left to law enforcement professionals. They further denied any knowledge of or complicity in either Perbix's or the school district's actions. Absolute Security stated that the next update of LANrev would permanently disable Theft Track.
