= Fresco (surname) =

Fresco is a surname. Notable people with the surname include:

- Abraham Fresco (1903–1942), Dutch painter, victim of the Holocaust
- Jacque Fresco (1916–2017), American polymath
- Louise Fresco (born 1952), Dutch scientist, director and writer
- Michael Fresco, American television director and producer
- Monte Fresco (1936–2013), English photographer
- Victor Fresco (born 1958), American film writer, brother of Michael
- Zohar Fresco (born 1969), Israeli percussionist and composer
- Abraham Aslan Fresco Effendi (1849-1912), Jewish Ottoman banker, financial advisor to Sultan Abdul Hamid II
