= Witold Walczak =

Swedish-born American legal director

Witold "Vic" Walczak
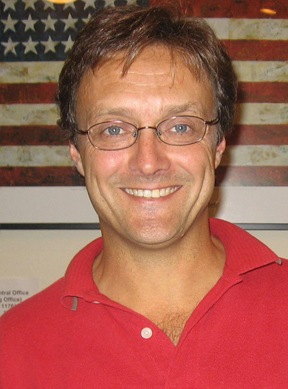
- Born: January 17, 1961 (age 65); Ystad, Sweden
- Occupation: Legal Director of the ACLU of Pennsylvania

Witold "Vic" Walczak (born January 17, 1961) is the legal director of the American Civil Liberties Union of Pennsylvania.

== Early life ==
Walczak was born in Ystad, Sweden on January 17, 1961, to Polish parents. His grandfather survived the Treblinka extermination camp. After the war his family was exiled from Poland by the incoming Communist Government. He emigrated to the United States at age three, and spent much of his childhood in Scotch Plains, New Jersey.

== Education and early career ==
Walczak attended Colgate University, where he played Division I soccer and majored in Philosophy. While at Colgate, he helped the Polish trade union Solidarity to resettle refugees in the United States. He graduated in 1983, and traveled that summer to Poland, which was under martial law. While assisting Solidarity in covert operations, Walczak was subjected to police brutality, wiretapping, and a strip search, and says that he narrowly avoided being imprisoned in Kraków.

Walczak attended Boston College Law School, graduating cum laude in 1986. Starting in 1986, he worked with the Prisoner Assistance Project of the Legal Aid Bureau in Baltimore, Maryland.

== American Civil Liberties Union ==
In 1991, Walczak's wife, a doctor, was offered a job in Pittsburgh. After first applying to become a prosecutor with the U.S. Attorney's office, he was hired as the executive director of the Pittsburgh Chapter of the ACLU's Pennsylvania affiliate. In 2004, Walczak was named legal director for the statewide affiliate.

== Notable cases ==
=== Kitzmiller v Dover Area School District ===
Walczak oversaw the ACLU of Pennsylvania's 2005 challenge to the Dover Area School District's policy requiring the teaching of Intelligent Design. This case, the first federal challenge to such requirements in public schools, has been credited with ending legal efforts by the Intelligent Design movement to introduce creationism into public school curriculum. The ACLU prevailed in the District Court, and after all eight school board members who voted for the Intelligent Design requirement were defeated by opponents who opposed the teaching of Intelligent Design in a science classroom, the school board did not appeal.

=== Lozano v City of Hazleton ===
Beginning in 2006, Walczak oversaw the ACLU of Pennsylvania's challenge to the Illegal Immigration Relief Act ordinances in Hazleton, Pennsylvania, arguing the case before the United States District Court and the United States Court of Appeals for the Third Circuit. The case was notable as the first federal trial challenging local efforts to regulate immigration. The ACLU won both in the District Court and on appeal, but the Supreme Court vacated the Third Circuit decision in June 2011, in light of its ruling in Chamber of Commerce v. Whiting, which addressed a similar law in Arizona. Third Circuit again declared the law unconstitutional in 2013, and the Supreme Court denied certiorari in 2014.

=== Mahanoy Area School District v. B.L. ===
Walczak and the ACLU represented a cheerleader at Mahanoy Area High School in Mahanoy City, who had been suspended for a year from the squad in 2017 after posting a Snap reading "fuck school fuck softball fuck cheer fuck everything" one weekend after not making the varsity squad at that year's tryouts. Both the Middle District of Pennsylvania and the Third Circuit agreed that the cheerleader's punishment violated the First Amendment under the Supreme Court's Tinker v. Des Moines Independent Community School District since it had not seriously disrupted school activities; the Third Circuit also held that Tinker did not apply to any student speech originating off-campus. The district, arguing that this created a circuit split, petitioned the Supreme Court to hear the case, which it agreed to do at the beginning of 2021. It will be the first time the Court has considered the question of what degree of protection the First Amendment offers student speech that originates off-campus.

== Hobbies and Interests ==
Walczak is a fan of Bruce Springsteen's music, and has cited Springsteen's song "Part Man, Part Monkey" as a source of inspiration during the Dover trial.
