= Microsoft Pinpoint =

Pinpoint
- Website type: Search Engine
- Available in: Multiple
- Owner: Microsoft
- Creator: Microsoft
- Website: http://pinpoint.microsoft.com
- Commercial: Yes
- Registration: Optional
- Launched: 2008
- Current status: Inactive

Microsoft Pinpoint was a searchable online directory of software applications and professional services based on Microsoft technologies. All software applications and services listed on the Pinpoint website were provided by independent information technology (IT) companies, including Microsoft Certified Partners, affiliated with the Microsoft Partner Network.

Pinpoint was launched in the United States in 2008. As of May 2010, the U.S. site contained more than 7,000 software application listings from more than 30,000 Microsoft-technology independent software vendors (ISVs).

Microsoft had announced plans to expand Pinpoint to most major markets worldwide by the end of 2010. A global roll-out of the directory began in 2009, with subsidiary websites launching in the United Kingdom, India, Germany, and the Netherlands, and as of July 2010, subsidiary websites had launched in Canada (French and English), Austria, Switzerland, France, Russia, Australia, Mexico, Chile, Argentina, Colombia, and Venezuela.

Pinpoint was the successor to Microsoft Solution Finder.

At the end of 2017 Pinpoint was shut down by Microsoft and Microsoft Partner Center proposed as a successor.

PinPoint is replaced by Microsoft Solution Providers
