= Luke Flintoft =

English clergyman and composer

- Born: 1680
- Died: 3 November 1727 (aged 46–47)
- Occupations: clergyman and composer
- Known for: double chant

Luke Flintoft (1680 - 3 November 1727), was an English clergyman and composer.

Flintoft was a chorister in the Choir of King's College, Cambridge, and took the degree of BA at Queens' College, Cambridge in 1700. He was appointed priest-vicar at Lincoln Cathedral in 1704. He remained there until 1714. On 4 December 1715 he was sworn as a gentleman of the Chapel Royal, and is described in the 'Cheque Book' as 'from Worcester,’ which therefore was probably his birthplace. On 9 July 1719 he was appointed reader in Whitehall Chapel, and was subsequently made a minor canon of Westminster. He died on 3 November 1727, and was buried in the cloisters of Westminster Abbey.

== Flintoft's Chant ==
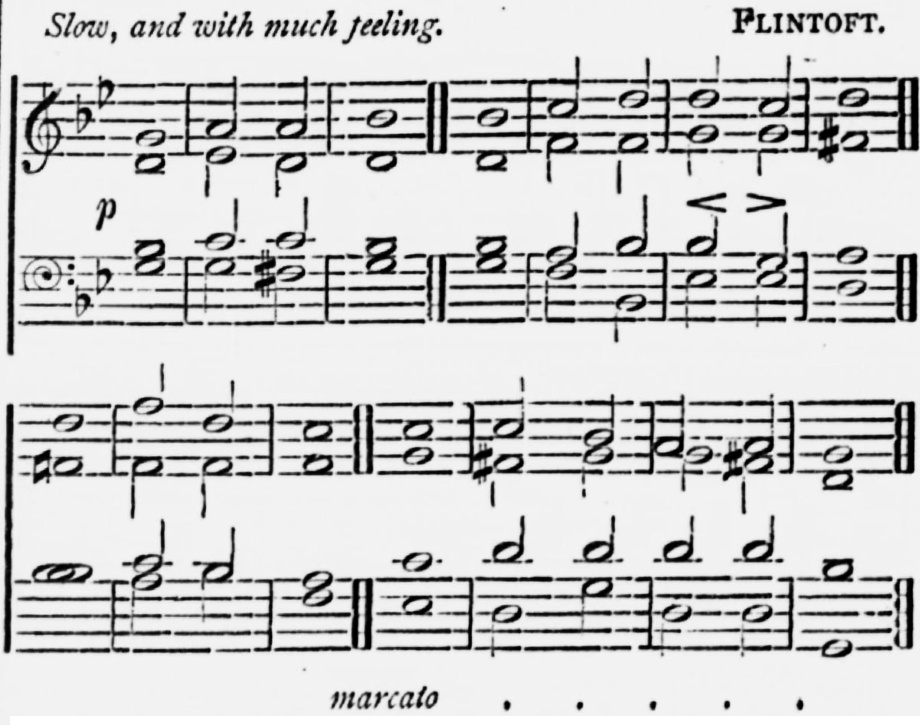
Double Chant - Flintoft

His claim to a place in musical history depends upon the question whether a certain 'double chant' in G minor, attributed to him, is or is not the first specimen of the kind in existence. The arguments for and against this will be found in 'Notes and Queries,’ 3rd ser. x. 206, xi. 267, 391, and 445.

Flintoft's Chant, described as "perhaps the most beautiful chant ever composed".

== Bibliography ==
This article incorporates text from a publication now in the public domain: "Flintoft, Luke". Dictionary of National Biography. London: Smith, Elder & Co. 1885–1900.
