= Fresco (web browser) =

Embedded web browser developed by ANT Software Limited

ANT Fresco
- Developer(s): ANT Software Limited
- Initial release: 1994; 31 years ago
- Written in: C
- Operating system: Microsoft Windows, Linux, many others
- Available in: Various languages
- Type: Web browser
- License: Proprietary
- Website: www.antplc.com

ANT Fresco was a proprietary, embedded web browser produced by ANT Software Limited, a software development firm headquartered in Cambridge, United Kingdom. Fresco was superseded by Galio in 2004.

== History ==
One of the first mainstream devices that used the Fresco web browser was the Prismiq Media Player released in 2003, and which featured 64 MB of RAM and a RISC CPU. The Prismiq media player received awards from print publications Financial Times and PC Magazine along with the website CNET. It supported HTML 4.01, JavaScript 1.3, optionally Macromedia Flash Player 5, SSL security, and antialiased fonts. IPTV tuners is another market niche where ANT's Fresco web browser has been used. By late 2006, ANT announced that Pace Micro Technology shipped its one millionth TV set-top box including its Fresco web browser.

The version of the Fresco browser as included in the Prismiq Media Player lacked support for AJAX and modern JavaScript. ANT addressed these shortcomings in ANT Galio, launched in 2004.
