= Microsoft Certified Partner =

A Microsoft Certified Partner (MCP) is a firm that provides Microsoft-related products or services, or support for such. It is part of the Microsoft Partner Network.

They are confirmed by Microsoft to be official, and that they work effectively, and help customers with a range of information technology (IT) projects and specific products and services. While not accredited to provide support to the same level as a Microsoft Gold Certified Partner for Support Services, many MCPs offer support as part of their services.

MCPs provide Microsoft services on behalf of Microsoft worldwide, spanning many fields including original equipment manufacturer (OEM), education, software providers, and technical support. They have 24-hour access to Microsoft Support, which enables them to provide reliable customer support. Every MCP has been in business for at least 5 years, has passed several tests, and has proven skills in their particular field. Microsoft rewards these partners with discounts in tools that are applicable to their activities. For example, in the educational field this might take the form of licenses to Microsoft Windows and Microsoft Office.

In return for participating in the program, partners gain support services and tools from Microsoft, often at a significant discount to their retail prices. However, over the lifetime of the contract some risk is transferred from Microsoft to the MCP in return for the benefits of the association with Microsoft and the ability to sell the support services.

== Microsoft Gold Certified Partner ==
Microsoft Gold Certified Partners are Microsoft's most highly accredited independent technical support providers. They must offer support for data management and software development. Becoming a partner requires the use of Microsoft technology as the primary platform for the firm.

== Microsoft Certified Training Partner ==
A Microsoft Certified Training Partner is an IT training company, independent of and unowned by Microsoft, that is officially approved by Microsoft to provide technical training and expertise for Microsoft products a part of the MCP Program.

The content of the IT training courses provided by Microsoft Certified Training Partner companies are certified by Microsoft regarding the accuracy of the instruction given. To receive the certification, a Microsoft Certified Training Partner must demonstrate a broad range of expertise in Microsoft Products. Microsoft Certified Instructors are required to have real-world expertise in Microsoft products as well as hold current Microsoft IT Certifications.

=== Microsoft Certified Training Partner levels ===
Microsoft Certified Training Partner is the basic level of the Microsoft Certified Training Partner Program. They have paid a fee to become certified, and must pay to use Microsoft tools and support.

Microsoft Gold Certified Partner is the highest level of the Microsoft Certified Partner Program. These firms have free access to the tools and support they need from Microsoft.
