= Microsoft Display Dock =

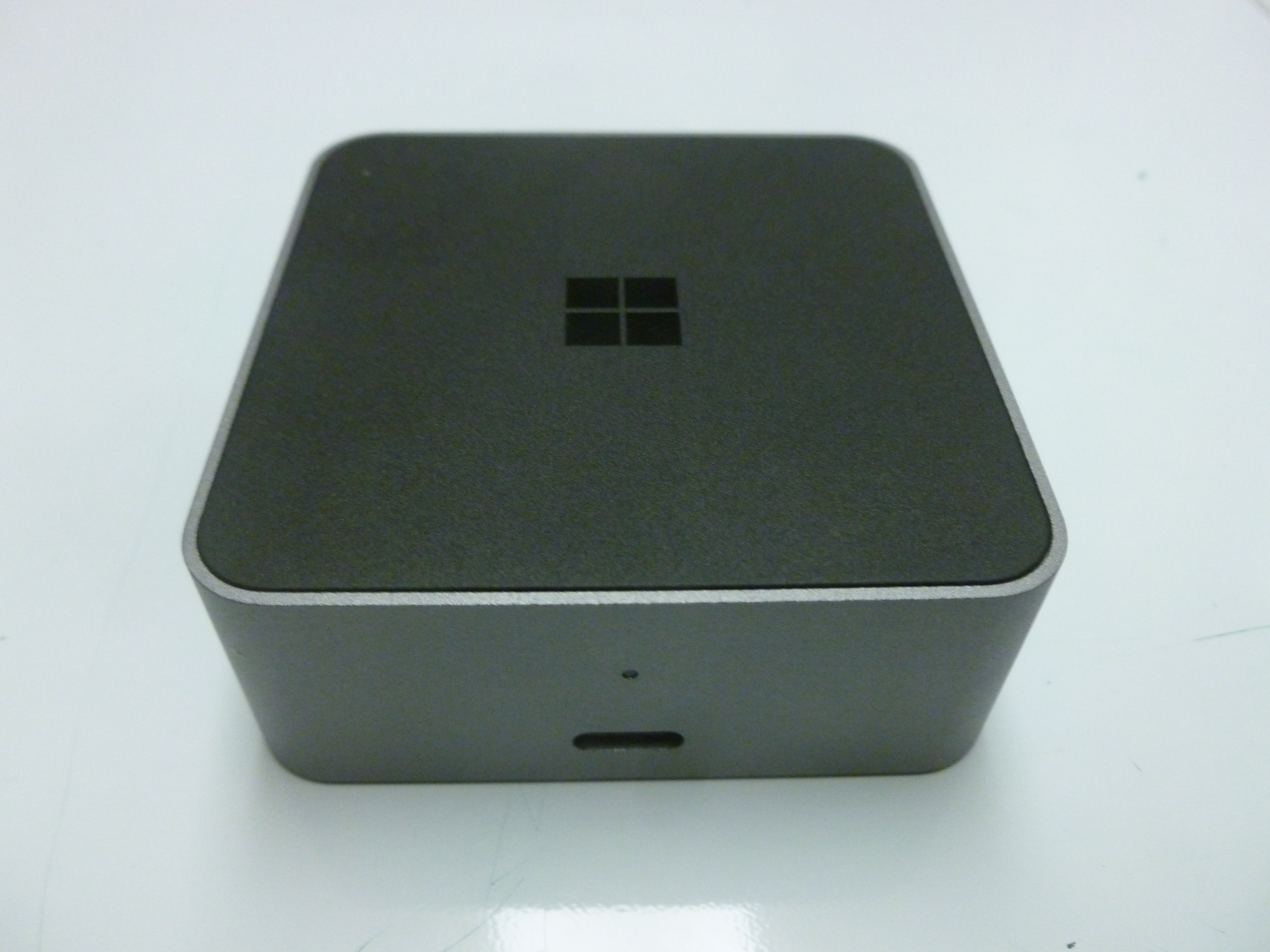
- Developer: Microsoft
- Manufacturer: Microsoft
- Type: Docking station
- Released: November 20, 2015
- Introductory price: $99
- Display: 1920 x 1080 and 1920 x 1200 resolution
- Input: Most USB peripherals, including keyboards, mice, and flash drives
- Connectivity: MyDP over USB-C; DisplayPort; HDMI; 2 x USB 2.0; 1 x USB 2.0 high current charging port
- Platform: Windows 10 Mobile
- Dimensions: 64.1 mm × 64.1 mm × 25.6 mm (2.52 in × 2.52 in × 1.01 in)
- Weight: 230 g (8.1 oz)
- Related: Microsoft Lumia 950, 950XL
- Website: www.microsoft.com/en-us/mobile/accessory/hd-500/

Microsoft Display Dock is a display docking station that allows selected Windows 10 mobile devices to connect to a computer monitor, mouse, and keyboard for a desktop PC-like experience. It is also the first device to act as a dock for Windows 10 Mobile's new "Continuum" feature which allows some mobile devices to run native mobile applications as if they were desktop applications, though despite emulating Windows 10 for PCs the software doesn't have most features that come with desktop versions such as running Windows Store applications side-by-side or Win32 applications, and various applications such as Microsoft Messaging and Skype do not run in full screen mode for larger monitors.

The display dock also worked as a normal USB hub if not connected to any output source.

Currently the only devices compatible with the Microsoft Display Dock are the Microsoft Lumia 950 and the Microsoft Lumia 950 XL. The dock will also work with the Microsoft Surface Go, Microsoft Surface Book 2 and other devices that support MyDP standard (also known as Mobility DisplayPort or SlimPort). However the dock's power supply is not powerful enough to charge the Surface at the same time, so the battery will slowly discharge during use unless the Surface's own power supply is also attached.

== Hardware ==
The Microsoft Display Dock is a cube-shaped object that measures 2.5 to 2.5 to 1 inch (HWD) and is covered in ports on both the front and the back of the device, and it weighs 8.1 ounces (230 grams). The Microsoft Lumia smartphone connects through the USB-C port on the front and on the back there are 3 USB Type-A ports, an HDMI-port, a full-sized DisplayPort connector, and a single USB Type-C port for power. Although there are two video output ports, only one of them can be used at a time.

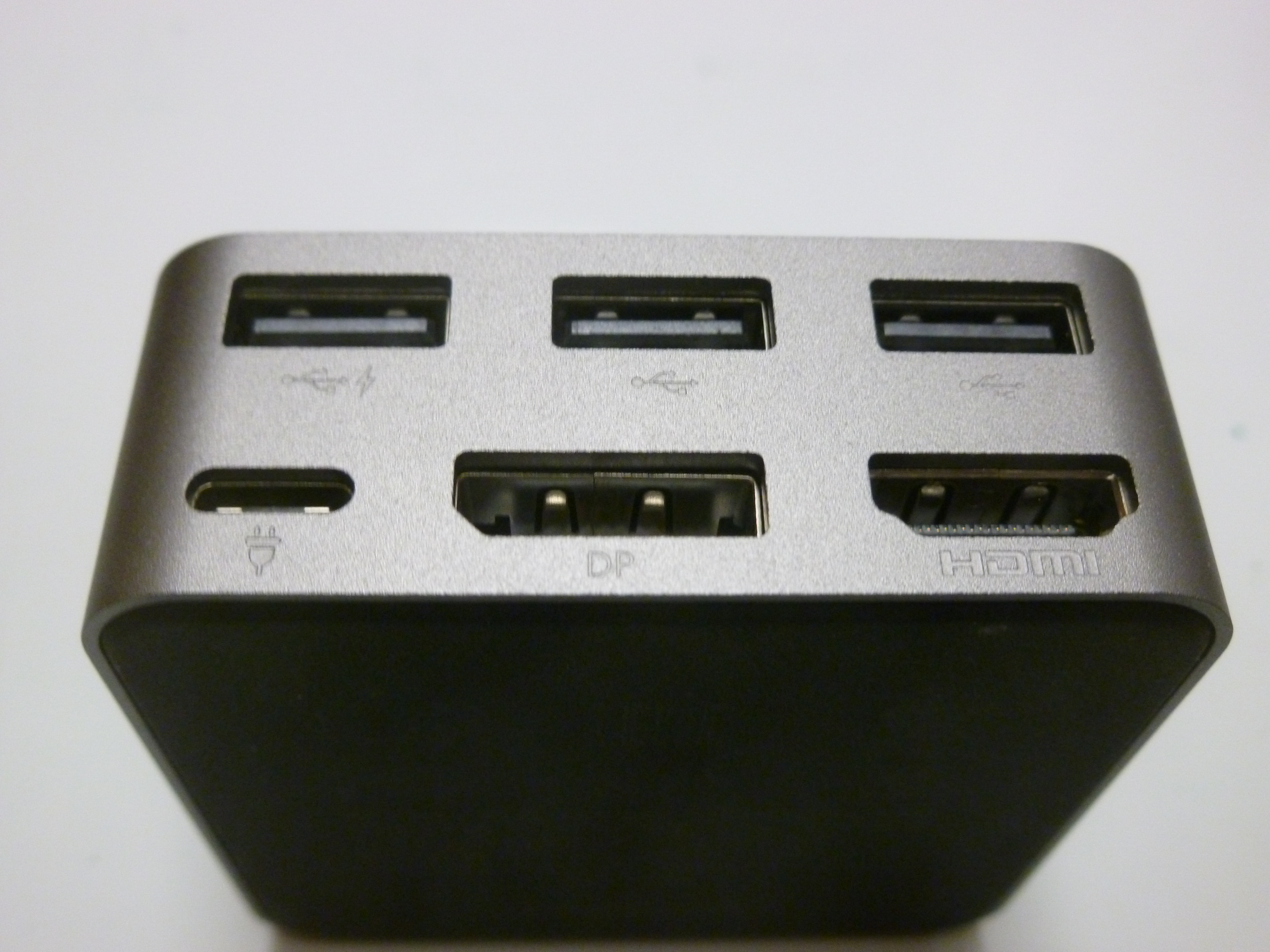
The rear side of the device.
