= Product certification =

Performance and quality assurance

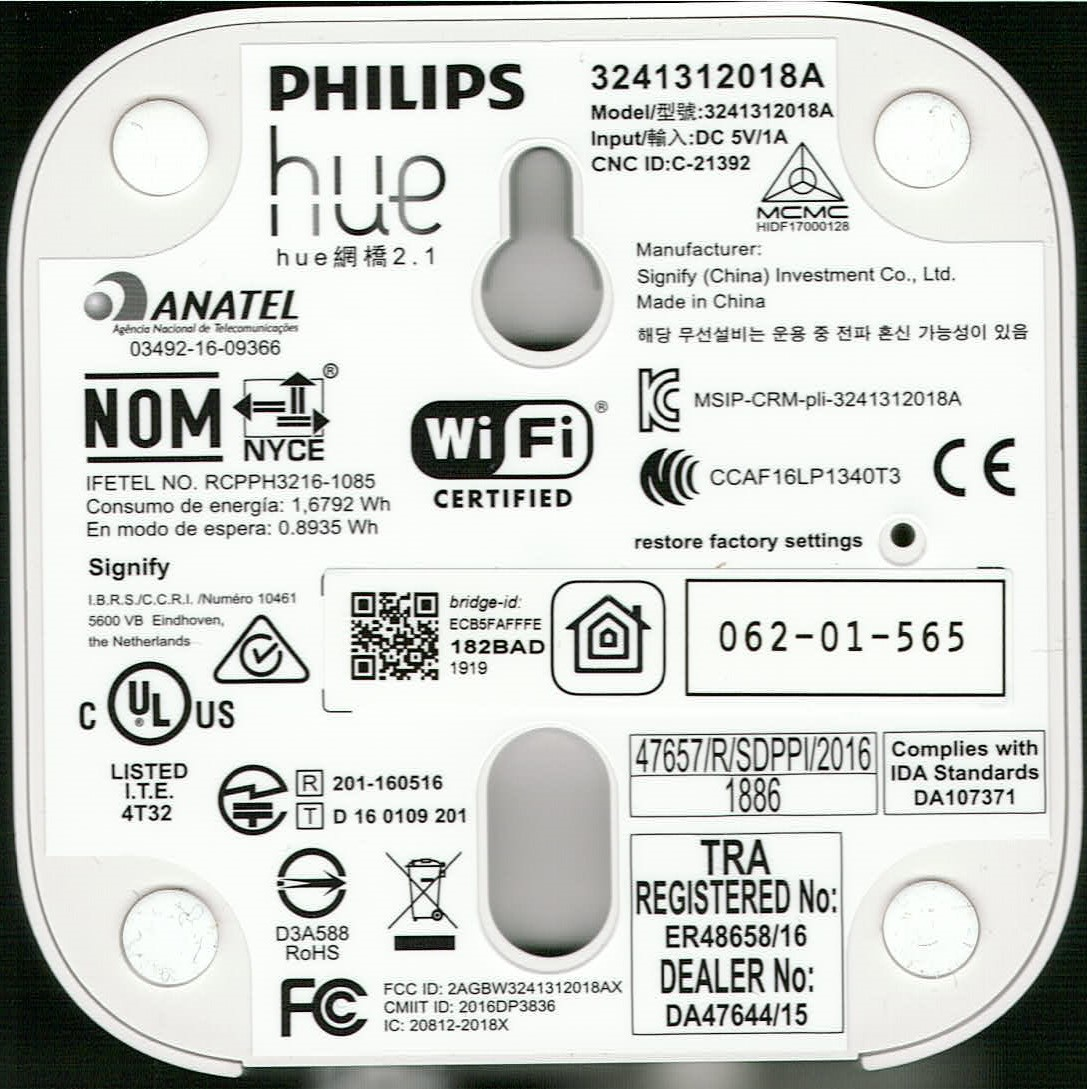
product certifications (many nations)

Product certification or product qualification is the process of certifying that a certain product has passed performance tests and quality assurance tests, and meets qualification criteria stipulated in contracts, regulations, or specifications (sometimes called "certification schemes" in the product certification industry).

Most product certification bodies (or product certifiers) are accredited to or aligned with ISO/IEC 17065 Conformity assessment—Requirements for bodies certifying products, processes and services (previously ISO/IEC Guide 65:1996) an international standard for ensuring competence in those organizations performing product, process and service certifications. The organizations that perform this accreditation are called Accreditation Bodies, and they themselves are assessed by international peers against the ISO 17011 standard.

Examples of some certification schemes include the Safety Equipment Institute (SEI) for PPE, the U.S. Federal Communications Commission (FCC) Telecommunication Certification Body (TCB) program for radio communication devices, the U.S. Environmental Protection Agency Energy Star program, the International Commission on the Rules for the Approval of Electrical Equipment Product Safety Certification Body Scheme (IEECE CB Scheme), MAS (Materials Analytical Services) Certified Green IEQ program, and the Greenguard Environmental Institute Indoor Air Quality program. In India, product certification is managed by the Bureau of Indian Standards. Certification schemes are typically written to include both the performance test methods that the product must be tested to, as well as the criteria that the product must meet to become Certified.

Certifications (and the certificates that document their existence) are often called "certs" in the everyday jargon of various industries.

== Certification process ==
A product might be verified to comply with a specification or stamped with a specification number. This does not, by itself, indicate that the item is fit for any particular use. The person or group of persons who own the certification scheme (i.e., engineers, trade unions, building code writers, government, industry, etc.) have the responsibility to consider the choice of available specifications, choose the correct ones, set qualification limits, and enforce compliance with those limits. The end users of the product have the responsibility to use the item correctly. Products must be used in accordance with their listing for certification to be effective.

Product certification is often required in sensitive industry and marketplace areas where a failure could have serious consequences, such as negatively affecting the health and welfare of the people or person using that product. For example, certification is stringent in aerospace applications, since the demands for low weight tend to lead to high stress on components, requiring appropriate metallurgy and accuracy in manufacturing. Other sensitive product area examples include food, pharmaceuticals, healthcare products, dangerous goods, electrical equipments and products that have RF emissions such as computers and cellular telephones.

The process for certification of a product is generally summed up in four steps:

- Application (including testing of the product)
- Evaluation (does the test data indicate that the product meets qualification criteria)
- Decision (does a second review of the product application concur with the Evaluation)
- Surveillance (does the product in the marketplace continue to meet qualification criteria)

In many instances, prior to applying for certification, a product supplier will send a product to a testing laboratory (some certification schemes require the product to be sent out for testing by the product certifier instead). When the product to be certified is received at the testing laboratory, it is tested in accordance with the laboratory's internal procedures and with the methods listed in the test standards specified by the certification scheme. The resulting data collected by the testing laboratory, and is then forwarded either back to the manufacturer, or directly to the product certifier.

The product certifier then reviews the product supplier's application information, including the testing data. If the certifier's evaluation concludes that the test data shows that the product meets all required criteria as listed in the certification scheme, and the decision maker(s) of the product certifier concur with the evaluation, then the product is deemed "certified" and is listed in a directory that the Product certifier is required to keep. ISO Guide 65 requires that the final decision to grant or not grant certification be made only by a person or group of persons not involved in the evaluation of the product.

Products often need periodic recertification, also known as surveillance. This requirement is typically identified within the certification scheme that the product is certified to. Certification bodies may require product suppliers to perform some sort of surveillance activity, such as pulling sample products from the marketplace for testing, in order to maintain their "listed" or "certified" status. Other examples of Surveillance activities include surprise audits of the manufacturing plant, supervision of the manufacturing and/or testing process, or a simple paperwork submittal from the supplier to the product certifier to ensure that the certified product has not changed. Other causes for recertification may include complaints issued against the product's functionality, which would require removal from the marketplace, and expiration of the original certification. These lists of examples are by no means all inclusive.

Some certification schemes, or the product certifiers that operate those Schemes, may require that the product supplier operate a Quality Management System registered to ISO 9000, or that the testing be performed by a laboratory accredited to ISO 17025. The decision to set these requirements is most often made by the person or group which owns the Certification Scheme.

== Certification marks and listings of certified products ==
Certified products are typically endorsed with a certification mark provided by the product certifier. Issuance of a certification mark is at the discretion of the individual product certifier. ISO Guide 65 does not require the product certifier to offer a certification mark in the event that a certificate is offered. When certification marks are issued and used on products, they are usually easy to see and enable users to track down the certification listings to determine the criteria that the product meets, and whether or not the listing is still active.

An active certification listing must minimally include indication of the following information:

- The specific product or type of product certified
- The qualification standard that the product is judged to meet
- The date of certification (and if applicable, its expiration)

Product certifiers may choose to include much more information than that listed above, but ISO 17065 specifies the bare minimum which must be made available regarding the certification status of a product.

These listings are typically used by an Authority Having Jurisdiction (AHJ), such as a municipal building inspector, fire prevention officer, or electrical inspector, to compare the product's use or installation with the intent of the rating by testing. In order to comply with the code, the product listing must be "active", as products and companies can become "de-listed" due to re-testing showing that a product no longer meets qualification criteria, or a business decision by the manufacturer.

The widespread availability of the Internet has led to a new kind of certification for websites. Website certifications exist to certify the website's privacy policy, security of their financial transactions, suitability for minors, among many other acceptability characteristics. In broadcast engineering, transmitters and radio antennas often must by certified by the country's broadcasting authority. In the United States, this certification was once called "type acceptance" by the Federal Communications Commission (FCC), and applied to most services except amateur radio due to its inherent homebrew nature. Today the FCC requires all testing of transmitters and antennas to be performed in a laboratory accredited to ISO 17025, with that laboratory being part of the overall organization that houses the Product Certification Body (TCB).

== Accreditation bodies ==
The International Accreditation Forum (IAF) has a listing of all recognized Accreditation Bodies whose accreditations to the ISO 17065 standard are deemed equivalent. From the IAF MLA informational page:

"IAF is encouraging more of its members to join the MLA as soon as they have passed a rigorous evaluation process to ensure that their accreditation programs are of world standard. The consequence of joining the IAF MLA is that conformity assessment certificates issued, within the scope of the IAF MLA, by conformity assessment bodies accredited by any one of the members of the IAF MLA will be recognised in the world wide IAF program."

Most countries only have a single Accreditation Body representing their economy in the IAF MLA. The two exceptions are the United States with American National Standards Institute (ANSI), American National Standards Institute - American Society for Quality National Accreditation Board (ANAB, a subdivision of ANSI), American Association for Laboratory Accreditation (A2LA), and International Accreditation Service (IAS) as signatory members, and United Accreditation Foundation as Full Member of IAF (International Accreditation Forum) Europe with Germany's Technischer Überwachungsverein (TÜV), and Korea which is represented by Korea Accreditation Board (KAB) and Korean Accreditation System (KAS). These listings are current as of March 2012, but will likely change in the future as more Accreditation Bodies undergo the required peer evaluations in order to become signatory members of the MLA.

Each Accreditation Body is required to keep a listing of those organizations it accredits, as well as a Scope of Accreditation which details the activities that the organizations can perform, whether that be testing, inspection, or product certification.

Accreditation Bodies routinely audit the Product Certifiers whom they have accredited in order to determine if the performance or actions of the organization have changed and do not meet the requirements of the Accreditation Body and the International Standards they are to conform to.

It is not mandatory for each Accreditation Bodies to be member of IAF or to join IAF in any manner, there have been several accreditation Board like AB-CAB, ESMA, NACI etc.

== European Economic Area ==
Within the European Economic Area (EEA), the majority of products are required to be ‘CE Marked’ and will have the letter CE on them. It shows that the manufacturer or importer has checked that these products meet EU safety, health or environmental requirements; is an indicator of a product’s compliance with EU legislation and allows the free movement of products within the European market.

By placing the CE marking on a product, a manufacturer or importer is declaring, on his sole responsibility, conformity with all of the legal requirements to achieve CE marking. The manufacturer is thus ensuring validity for that product to be sold throughout the EEA. This also applies to products made in third countries which are sold in the EEA and Turkey.

If you are a manufacturer it is your responsibility to:

- carry out the conformity assessment (including any testing, if required)
- set up the technical file
- issue the EC Declaration of Conformity (DoC)
- place CE marking on a product

If you are a distributor you must check the presence of both the CE marking and the necessary supporting documentation.

If you are importing a product that is from a third country you have to check that the manufacturer outside the EU has undertaken the necessary steps. You must check that the documentation is available. The Europa website gives details various product categories and the relevant EU directives to which products must conform.

== See also ==
- Professional certification – Designation earned by a person to assure qualification to perform a job or task
- Certified wood – Wood product from a responsibly managed forest
- Farm assurance – Certification for agricultural products
  - Organic certification – Certification for producers of organic food
- Fire protection – Measures that prevent or mitigate unwanted fire
- Hardware certification – Process for testing computer hardware
- CE marking – European Declaration of conformity mark
