= Surface Book 3 =

2-in-1 PC by Microsoft

- Developer: Microsoft
- Type: 2-in-1 detachable
- Generation: Third
- Released: 6 May 2020; 6 years ago
- Availability: 21 May 2020; 6 years ago
- Introductory price: 15.0": USD 2,300 to 3,400; 13.5": USD 1,600 to 2,700
- Operating system: Windows 10 Home (Consumer models); Windows 10 Pro (upgradeable on consumer models, standard on business)
- CPU: 15.0": Intel Core i7-1065G7; 13.5": Intel Core i5-1035G7 or Intel Core i7-1065G7
- Memory: 15.0": 32 GB or 16 GB RAM; 13.5": 32 GB or 16 GB or 8 GB RAM
- Storage: 15.0": 2 TB, 1 TB, 512 GB, 256 GB; 13.5": 1 TB, 512 GB, 256 GB
- Removable storage: SDXC
- Display: PixelSense Touchscreen; 3:2 Aspect Ratio; 15.0": 3240 x 2160, 260 PPI; 13.5": 3000 x 2000, 267 PPI
- Graphics: 15.0": Nvidia GeForce GTX 1660 Ti Max-Q or Nvidia Quadro RTX 3000 Max-Q; 13.5": Intel Iris Plus or Nvidia GeForce GTX 1650 Max-Q
- Sound: Front facing stereo speakers with Dolby Atmos, 3.5 mm headphone jack, dual far-field studio mics
- Input: Built in: touchscreen, proximity sensor, ambient light sensor, accelerometer, gyroscope, magnetometer Sold Separately: Mouse, Surface Pen, Surface Dial
- Camera: Front: 5 MP, 1080p HD; Rear: 8 MP, 1080p HD
- Touchpad: Built-in
- Connectivity: Xbox Wireless (15" exclusive), WiFi 6, Bluetooth 5, 2x USB 3, USB C, NFC
- Online services: Microsoft Store, OneDrive
- Dimensions: i7 15.0": 343 x 251 x 15-23 mm (13.5 x 9.87 x 0.568-0.90 in) i7 13.5": 312 x 232 x 15-23 mm (12.3 x 9.14 x 0.59-0.90 in) i5 13.5": 312 x 232 x 13-23 mm (12.3 x 9.14 x 0.51-0.90 in)
- Weight: i7 15.0": 1,905 grams (4.200 lb) includes keyboard i7 13.5": 1,534 grams (3.382 lb) includes keyboard i5 13.5": 1,642 grams (3.620 lb) includes keyboard
- Predecessor: Surface Book 2
- Successor: Discontinued, replaced by Surface Laptop Studio
- Website: www.surface.com

The Surface Book 3 is the third generation of Microsoft's Surface Book series, and a successor to the Surface Book 2. Like its previous generation, the Surface Book 3 is part of the Microsoft Surface lineup of personal computers. It is a 2-in-1 PC that can be used like a conventional laptop, or detached from its base for use as a separate tablet, with touch and stylus input support in both scenarios. It was announced by Microsoft online alongside the Surface Go 2 on May 6, 2020, and later released for purchase on May 21, 2020.

== Configurations ==
Surface Book 3 Configuration Options
| Price Tier in USD | | Size | CPU | GPU | RAM | Internal storage |
| Consumer | Business | Size | CPU | GPU | RAM | Internal storage |
|---|---|---|---|---|---|---|
| 1600 | 1700 | 13.5" | Intel Core i5-1035G7 (1.2 to 3.7 GHz) | Intel Iris Plus (GT2 @ 1.05 GHz) | 8 GB | 256 GB |
| 2000 | 2100 | 13.5" | Intel Core i7-1065G7 (1.3 to 3.9 GHz) | Nvidia GeForce GTX 1650 Max-Q (4 GB GDDR5) | 16 GB | 256 GB |
| 2500 | 2600 | 13.5" | Intel Core i7-1065G7 (1.3 to 3.9 GHz) | Nvidia GeForce GTX 1650 Max-Q (4 GB GDDR5) | 32 GB | 512 GB |
| 2700 | 2800 | 13.5" | Intel Core i7-1065G7 (1.3 to 3.9 GHz) | Nvidia GeForce GTX 1650 Max-Q (4 GB GDDR5) | 32 GB | 1 TB |
| 2300 | 2400 | 15" | Intel Core i7-1065G7 (1.3 to 3.9 GHz) | Nvidia GeForce GTX 1660 Ti Max-Q (6 GB GDDR6) | 16 GB | 256 GB |
| 2800 | 2900 | 15" | Intel Core i7-1065G7 (1.3 to 3.9 GHz) | Nvidia GeForce GTX 1660 Ti Max-Q (6 GB GDDR6) | 32 GB | 512 GB |
| 3000 | 3100 | 15" | Intel Core i7-1065G7 (1.3 to 3.9 GHz) | Nvidia GeForce GTX 1660 Ti Max-Q (6 GB GDDR6) | 32 GB | 1 TB |
| 3400 | 3500 | 15" | Intel Core i7-1065G7 (1.3 to 3.9 GHz) | Nvidia GeForce GTX 1660 Ti Max-Q (6 GB GDDR6) | 32 GB | 2 TB (US & Canada) |
| | 3500 | 15" | Intel Core i7-1065G7 (1.3 to 3.9 GHz) | Nvidia Quadro RTX 3000 Max-Q (6 GB GDDR6) | 32 GB | 512 GB |
| | 3700 | 15" | Intel Core i7-1065G7 (1.3 to 3.9 GHz) | Nvidia Quadro RTX 3000 Max-Q (6 GB GDDR6) | 32 GB | 1 TB |

== Features ==
=== Hardware ===
Surface Book 3 retains most of the hardware from the previous generation, released in November 2017. This includes the same full-body magnesium alloy construction and design, footprint, keyboard, touchpad, cameras, discrete TPM chip with identical support for AES full-drive encryption, and the same display panel options. The 13.5-inch model Surface Book 3 features a 3000×2000 pixels resolution screen at 267 pixels per inch, and 3240×2160 pixels resolution at 260 pixels per inch for the 15-inch model. Both screens feature a 3:2 aspect ratio, to echo a key feature of the Surface lineup.

The new generation offers some hardware improvements, including new Dolby-certified speakers, improved battery life, a new hinge release, and an updated Surface Connect port that supports a higher electrical input. It is the first device in the Microsoft Surface lineup to offer the Intel 10th generation quad-core processors, optional Nvidia Quadro graphics, up to 32 GB of system memory, and up to 2 TB for data storage. The 13.5-inch model is sold with a 102 W charger, while a more powerful 127 W charger comes with the 15-inch model. Both devices no longer suffer from battery drain during heavy workloads, which was a problem occasionally observed with the last generation.

Much like the previous generation, Microsoft has opted to forego Thunderbolt 3 due to overall security concerns with the protocol.

=== Software ===
As of May 2020, both the 13.5-inch and 15-inch models ship with a pre-installed trial of Microsoft Office 365, as well as a pre-installed 64-bit Windows 10 Home for all general customers. It is a downgrade compared to the predecessor, which offered Windows 10 Professional to all consumers, business and enterprise customers.

Unlike its predecessor, the Surface Book 3 only comes pre-installed with Windows 10 Pro if it is ordered via business procurement channels. For most consumers, it will only come with a step down, Windows 10 Home.

=== Accessories ===
The new Surface Book 3 is backwards-compatible with some of the same peripheral accessories of its direct predecessors, such as the Surface Pen and the Surface Docks, however notably despite advertising otherwise, it is not fully compatible with the Surface Dial and lacks the advertised on-screen functionality.

As with its predecessor, the Surface Book 2, it has the ability to use built-in pen computing capabilities based on N-trig technology Microsoft acquired in 2015, although no significant updates have been made for this new release. All major tweaks and improvements, which Microsoft had first released for the Surface Book 2, are also applied to this new generation.

Both the Surface Book 2 & 3 share the same display options, with the same 10-point touch support. With that said, the tablet and keyboard base portions are not interchangeable between the Surface Book 2 and 3. A series of magnets are installed in opposing positions, alongside additional software controls, to ensure that users will not accidentally mix hardware between the two generations.

== Release timeline ==
Timeline of Surface devices
Sources: Microsoft Devices Blog Microsoft Surface Store Microsoft Surface for Business store

== Reception ==
Compared to the broadly positive feedback awarded to its predecessor, the Surface Book 3 only received lukewarm reviews.

Most reviewers mentioned the Surface Book 3 continues to feel like a premium product. The updated graphics options, effective cooling for the GPU, high-quality cameras, keyboard, touch and pen capabilities continue to be applauded, as is the improved tablet release. With that said, the underwhelming CPU options, poor thermals in the main computing unit (despite the tablet being nearly identical in thickness to the Apple MacBook Pro 16-inch's base), thick screen bezels, and an outdated design were all common complaints, with the product appearing largely identical to original Surface Book introduced 5 years ago, in 2015.

For creative production, reviewers noted the screen suffered from poor overall accuracy, contrast, and color range (at less than 70% coverage of the DCI-P3 standard) compared to other direct competitors, such as the Apple MacBook Pro and Dell XPS lineup, both of which come with factory-calibrated displays and significantly better visual reproduction than the Surface Book 3. For gaming and entertainment consumption, the Surface Book 3's thick screen bezels, slow response time, and the lack of higher refresh-rate display panels negatively impacted the product proposition in this area. For other high-performance workloads, the Surface Book 3 also fell short compared to several key competitors, many of which offer 6 or 8-core processors and up to 64 GB system memory (128 GB in some cases); in contrast, the Surface Book 3 has a low-powered 4-core ultrabook processor and up to 32 GB memory.

Aside from the device's poor market fit and consequential niche appeal, some reviewers also raised concerns about stagnation in product innovation.

When reviewing the 13.5-inch model, Dieter Bohn of The Verge said, "The idea here is you're supposed to get a full-powered, pro laptop with a GPU, and lots of horsepower and battery at the base, but if you want you may also detach the screen and detach it into a tablet. Now, with the third iteration, we finally understand the trade-offs (...) You have to ask yourself, how much the detach means to you." While he continues to highlight the device's good quality hardware, touch and pen capabilities, and impressive graphics performance, he also noted the Intel Core i7 CPU equipped inside the device is restrictive, "the extra cost that you pay doesn't really fit on the specs sheet."

Devindra Hardawar of Engadget, who gave positive remarks to the predecessor Surface Book 2, notes similar problems with the lackluster CPU performance in 2020, "The Surface Book 3 features Intel's quad-core 10th generation Ice Lake CPUs, which max out at a 3.9GHz Turbo Boost speed. Those chips also appear in the Surface Laptop 3, an ultraportable that doesn’t even pretend to handle heavy lifting. The MacBook Pro 16-inch, on the other hand, offers Intel's recent six and eight-core CPUs, including the monstrously powerful 5GHz Core i9. Dell's XPS 15 can also be configured with similar chips reaching up to 5.1GHz. You do the math. There's just no way the Surface Book 3 can compete in a CPU fight."

Luke Larsen of Digital Trends writes, "CPU performance on its own isn’t impressive for a device this large. There’s one primary reason for this: It uses the same 15-watt chip that appears in small laptops like the Dell XPS 13, Surface Laptop 3, and HP Spectre x360 13," "The difference in core count makes a massive difference in performance. Add four cores with a laptop like the Dell XPS 15, and you’ll see a 53% better score in Cinebench R20’s multi-core test than the Surface Book 3."

Jordan Novet, on CNBC, noted the Surface Book 3's ability to handle heavy graphical workloads, but also criticized the device's dated design and poor battery life, "Microsoft could stand to get more experimental with this product. Performance is excellent. The computer stays quiet and cool to the touch while handling workloads that can challenge lesser machines. (However,) I typically got around six and a half hours’ worth of battery life on the Surface Book 3. That's disappointing because I got almost seven and a half hours on the previous model (...) Don't get me wrong. The Surface Book 3 isn't a bad PC. If you need a new PC, you could do worse. It's just iterative, and no longer feels fresh. It's not a major leap forward for Microsoft's most powerful portable PC. When Microsoft redesigns the Surface Book and makes this otherwise very good laptop look modern again, then it'll be easier to justify the splurge."

== Known issues ==
Some devices suffer from screen blackout issues.

Some devices are known to have battery connection issues that worsen over time and may require battery replacement.

| Preceded by Surface Book 2 | Surface Book; 3rd generation | Most recent |
