= Surface Book =

Laptop by Microsoft

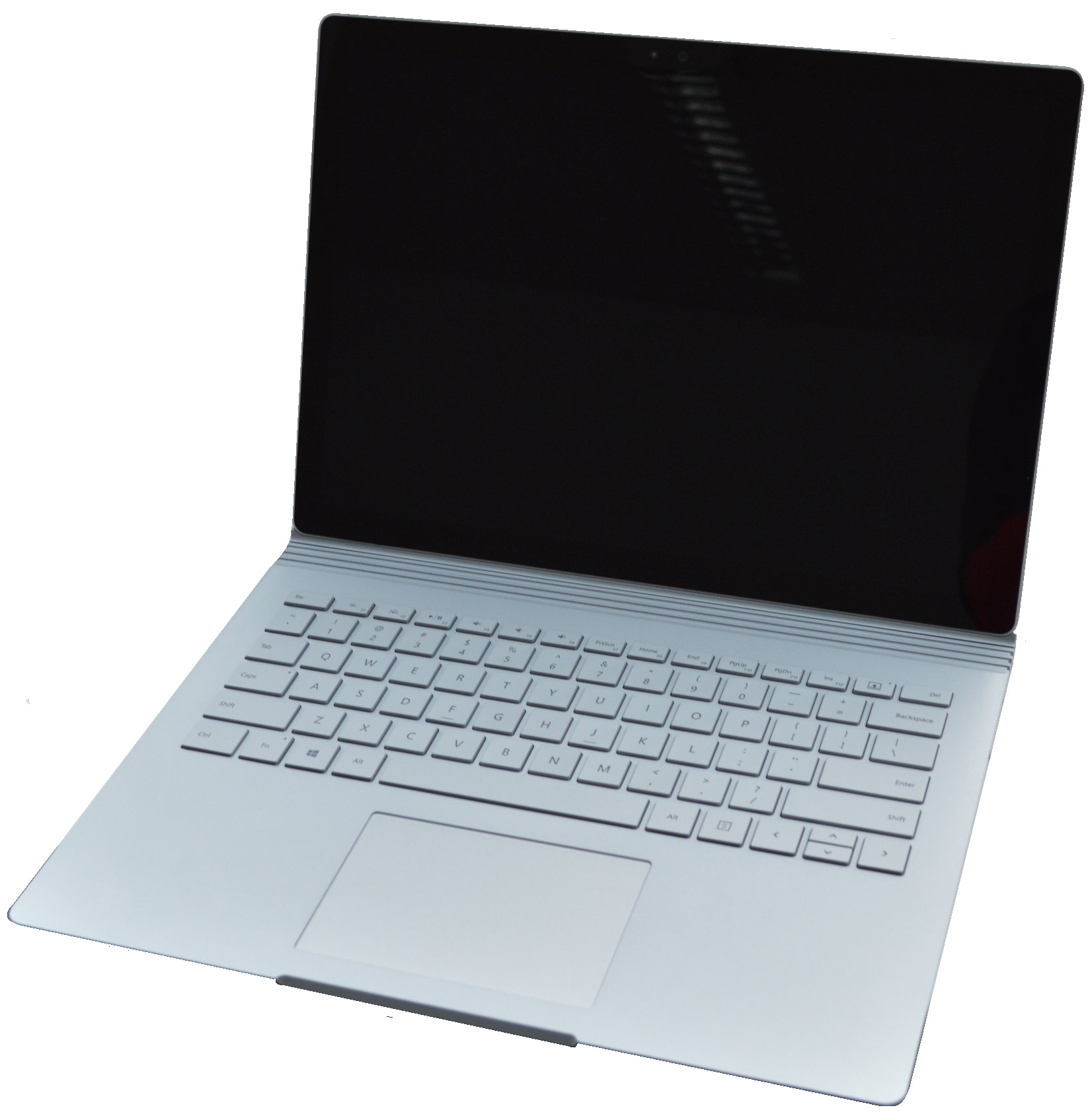
- Developer: Microsoft
- Product family: Microsoft Surface
- Type: 2-in-1 PC
- Released: October 26, 2015 with Performance Base: November 10, 2016
- Introductory price: US$1,499.00 to $3,299.00; CA$1,949.00 to $4,379.00 £1,299.00 to £2,649.00
- Operating system: Windows 10 Pro
- CPU: Intel Skylake dual-core processor: i5-6300U; 2.4 up to 3.0 GHz, 3 MB cache, 15 W i7-6600U; 2.6 up to 3.4 GHz, 4 MB cache, 15 W
- Memory: 8 or 16 GB LPDDR3 RAM
- Storage: SSD: 128 GB, 256 GB, 512 GB, 1 TB
- Removable storage: Full-size SD card slot (supports SDXC cards)
- Display: 13.5", 3000×2000 (267 PPI) LCD
- Graphics: Intel HD Graphics 520; Optional custom variant of Nvidia GeForce 940M GPU with 1 GB of GDDR5 memory or Nvidia GeForce GTX 965M GPU 2 GB of GDDR5 memory within keyboard part
- Sound: Stereo speakers, dual microphones, headset jack
- Input: Keyboard, touchpad mouse, stylus pen, sensors: accelerometer, gyroscope, magnetometer, ambient light, Surface Dial
- Camera: 5.0 MP front, 8.0 MP rear 1080p HD video recording
- Touchpad: 5-point multi-touch
- Connectivity: 802.11a/b/g/n/ac Wi-Fi, Bluetooth 4.2, two USB 3.0 ports, Mini DisplayPort
- Dimensions: As a tablet: 12.3 by 8.67 by 0.3 inches (31.24 cm × 22.02 cm × 0.76 cm); As a laptop: 12.3 by 9.14 by 0.9 inches (31.2 cm × 23.2 cm × 2.3 cm)
- Weight: As a tablet: 1.6 pounds (0.73 kg); As a laptop: 3.34 pounds (1.51 kg); As a laptop with Performance Base: 3.68 pounds (1.67 kg)
- Successor: Surface Book 2
- Website: Surface.com

The Surface Book is a 2-in-1 PC designed and produced by Microsoft, part of the company's Surface line of personal computing devices, and released on October 26, 2015. Surface Book is distinguished from other Surface devices primarily by its full-sized, detachable keyboard, which uses a dynamic fulcrum hinge that expands when it is opened. The keyboard contains a second battery, a number of ports and an optional discrete graphics card used when the screen part, also dubbed as the clipboard by Microsoft, is docked to it. Unlike Surface Pro devices, which are marketed as tablets, the Surface Book is marketed as a laptop, Microsoft's first device marketed as such. Unlike the Surface Laptop devices, the two parts are detachable. It was succeeded by Surface Book 2.

== History ==
Surface Book was announced at the Windows 10 Devices Event by Microsoft on October 6, 2015, alongside the Surface Pro 4, and went on sale shortly thereafter. At the announcement, Panos Panay, corporate vice president for Surface Computing at Microsoft, initially presented the device as a laptop and positioned it as a competitor to the MacBook Pro, before revealing that it was a hybrid device, with a screen that could be detached and used with just the Surface Pen.

In October 2016, Microsoft announced an updated Surface Book with a new Nvidia GeForce GTX 965M GPU and additional battery life over the original model.

In May 2017, Microsoft revealed the successor to the Surface Book, the Surface Book 2, which was itself replaced by the Surface Book 3 in 2020.

== Features ==
=== Design ===
The Surface Book's design was influenced by a goal to design a 2-in-1 convertible tablet that could be folded like a laptop, and not require the keyboard to be heavier than the tablet portion in order to support and balance the tablet portion. To reach this goal, the Surface development team developed a special hinge on the keyboard that would increase the footprint of the device when opened, thus maintaining the balance without increasing the weight differential between the two parts. The hinge is accompanied by muscle wire locks that secure the tablet portion to the keyboard. The wires are made from nickel titanium—an alloy that contracts when exposed to an electrical current; pressing a release button on the keyboard sends an electrical impulse through the wires that attach or release the clips. The team also worked with the Microsoft team developing Windows 10 to implement a switchable graphics system, where the tablet would be able to switch to a discrete graphics card located within the keyboard when docked, and revert to internal graphics when undocked.

The Surface Book's use cases are reflected by several design decisions, such as referring to the tablet portion as being a clipboard. Additionally, while the device as a whole is rated as having 12 hours of battery life, this capacity is divided between two separate batteries within the clipboard and keyboard portions: the clipboard has a 4-hour battery, while the base has 8-hour. The Surface Book's keyboard is considered a standard component of the device, and is bundled with all models.

The device consists of a tablet portion with a 13.5 inches (34 cm), 3000×2000 resolution display, and a keyboard attachment. That allows it to function similarly to a traditional laptop. Both components are constructed from machined magnesium. The Surface Book's keyboard utilizes a dynamic fulcrum hinge, which compresses when closed, and expands outwards when opened. The hinge design allows the tablet portion to be held up at an angle resembling a traditional laptop screen without the use of a kickstand, a supporting part found in Surface-series devices, and increases the physical room between the keyboard and the tablet.

=== Hardware ===
Surface Book is the first Surface-family 2-in-1 to be shipped with a keyboard. Contrary to a Type Cover optional keyboard accessory of other Surface tablets, Surface Book's keyboard is a thick and sturdy part, capable of folding back behind the display. It contains two USB 3.0 ports, full-size SD card slot on the left, Mini DisplayPort and SurfaceConnect port on the right, has an integrated additional battery and an optional Nvidia discrete GPU with 1 GB of video memory. It can be used for non-demanding tasks such as web browsing without the connected keyboard part, and when laptop convenience, extended connectivity, performance, and battery life are needed — with the keyboard attached.

The 2-in-1's display features the same 3:2 aspect ratio and 10-point multi-touch display, found in other Surface tablets starting from Surface Pro 3, but its size and resolution are significantly increased at 13.5 inches (34 cm) and 3000×2000 (267 PPI) respectively.

Surface Book models are built with a 6th generation Skylake Intel Core i5 or i7 processors. The top CPU option, i7-6600U, has a clock rate of 2.6 GHz, with up to 3.4 GHz in Turbo Boost mode. There is no TPM chip.

There is an Intel HD Graphics 520 GPU available, integrated in all processor options, however it is possible to order a Surface Book with an additional custom variant of Nvidia GeForce 940M Maxwell-architecture discrete GPU for the improved operation of GPU performance-demanding programs such as Adobe Premiere Pro. During the presentation it was stated that the models with Nvidia GPU can comfortably run games with a performance footprint of League of Legends. The Surface Book is able to connect and disconnect the discrete GPU automatically, on-the-fly and without an OS reboot needed, when user attaches and detaches the keyboard part.

Two system memory options available are: 8 or 16 GB and four SSD options: 128, 256, 512 GB, or 1 TB, but the higher SSD option is not available in some countries.

The front camera contains an infrared sensor that supports logging in with Windows Hello.

Surface Book allowing the user to detach the screen section from the keyboard section

Surface Book Configuration Options
Price Tier (USD)	Size	CPU	GPU	RAM	Internal Storage
1,499	13.5"	Intel Core i5-6300U	Intel HD Graphics 520	8 GB	128 GB
1,699	13.5"	Intel Core i5-6300U	Intel HD Graphics 520	8 GB	256 GB
2,099	13.5"	Intel Core i5-6300U	Intel HD Graphics 520	8 GB	512 GB
2,499	13.5"	Intel Core i7-6600U	Intel HD Graphics 520	16 GB	512 GB
1,899	13.5"	Intel Core i5-6300U	Nvidia GeForce 940M 1 GB	8 GB	256 GB
2,099	13.5"	Intel Core i7-6600U	Nvidia GeForce 940M 1 GB	8 GB	256 GB
2,699	13.5"	Intel Core i7-6600U	Nvidia GeForce 940M 1 GB	16 GB	512 GB
2,399	13.5"	Intel Core i7-6600U	Nvidia GeForce 965M 2 GB	8 GB	256 GB
2,799	13.5"	Intel Core i7-6600U	Nvidia GeForce 965M 2 GB	16 GB	512 GB
3,299	13.5"	Intel Core i7-6600U	Nvidia GeForce 965M 2 GB	16 GB	1TB

==== Surface Book with Performance Base ====
At the Microsoft Windows 10 event on October 26, 2016, Microsoft announced a version of the Surface Book that contained an updated Nvidia GeForce GTX 965M discrete GPU along with an additional 1 GB of GDDR5 video memory (meaning the new Surface Book now has 2 GB of vRAM instead of 1 GB). The base of this updated Surface Book is also thicker than the original in order to incorporate an additional cooling fan for the new GPU and more internal batteries, allowing for an additional 4 hours of video playback - upping the total claimed runtime of the device to 16 hours. This model is also 0.3 pounds (0.14 kg) heavier and is available only with an Intel Core i7 processor. There are no upgrades to the processors, RAM, or storage in the Surface Book with Performance Base over the original.

=== Software ===
Surface Book models ship with a pre-installed 64-bit version of Windows 10 Pro and a 30-day trial Microsoft Office suite. The system does not meet the system requirements for upgrade to Windows 11.

=== Accessories ===
A Surface Dock was announced alongside the Surface Book and Surface Pro 4, and is compatible with both devices. It is also backward compatible with the Surface Pro 3. The Surface Dock adds two Mini DisplayPorts, one Gigabit Ethernet, four USB 3.0 and one audio out port to the 2-in-1.

Just like the Surface Pro devices, Surface Book includes a Surface Pen. Surface Book ships with the latest version of the pen with 1024 levels of pressure. A Surface Pen Tip Kit is also available for order, which includes a set of pen tips of various diameter aimed for artists and illustrators.

== Reception and issues ==
=== Critical reception ===
Upon release the Surface Book received critical acclaim for its design and functionality, as well as its integration of a secondary GPU into the keyboard. However, the lack of certain features, such as LTE connectivity and USB-C ports, was noted along with the price of the highest-specs model (US$3,200 for one with 1 TB of storage and a Core i7). In addition, many reviewers had pre-release issues with the hinge undocking mechanism and graphics display drivers, both of which Microsoft resolved at a later date through a Windows software update. The first review versions of the hardware did not initially have Windows Hello enabled, but after a firmware update enabled it reception of the feature was positive. The "teardown" site iFixit scored the Surface Book 1/10 for repairability mainly due to the use of glue instead of screws to hold the unit together and the impossibility of upgrading things such as the CPU and RAM that are both soldered to the motherboard.

=== Issues ===
The Windows Hello driver included in a firmware update failed to properly reinitialize the infrared camera after waking from sleep mode, causing Windows Hello to fail until a reboot. Firmware updates were issued in April and May 2016 to fix the camera. The device had a battery life issue where it failed to sleep properly, draining the battery very quickly. Microsoft developed a fix that was available on February 17, 2016. An additional issue raised by many Surface owners is problems with expanding lithium batteries that causes screen discoloration and separation of the screen from the body of the computer. This has led to concerns about potential fire and explosion hazards. The design of the Surface does not allow for the battery to be easily exchanged. Other reported problems included power management issues in which sleep and standby modes resulted in the unexpected continual drain of the battery. Furthermore, overheating and CPU throttling to compensate for it are issues in the Surface Book 3's (13.5"), because they no longer have fans in the tablet.

== Timeline ==
Timeline of Surface devices
Sources: Microsoft Devices Blog Microsoft Surface Store Microsoft Surface for Business store

Preceded by –	Surface Book; 1st generation	Succeeded by Surface Book 2
