= Christopher Tarnovsky =

Computer security expert (born 1971)

Christopher Tarnovsky (born 20 April 1971, Nyack, New York) is an integrated circuit (IC) reverse engineer and hacker.

== Career ==
In the 1990s, Tarnovsky was a soldier in the United States army in the field of intelligence, security and cryptography. From 1997 to 2007, Tarnovsky worked for NDS developing copy protection technology. He then started his own company, Flylogic, which he sold to IOActive in 2012. Until 2014 Tarnovsky was vice president of semiconductor services at IOActive. Tarnovsky has a diagnosis of ADHD, which gives him the ability to "hyper-focus" on projects for hours at a time.

In 2001, DirecTV, a client of NDS, a company majority owned by Rupert Murdoch's Newscorp, demanded Tarnovsky be kept away from their systems. Plaintiffs DirecTV, Dish Network and Nagrastar alleged Tarnovsky was hacking the protections they placed on their set-top box smart cards which were used to lock transmission from customers who defaulted.

In 2002, Canal Plus, a French premium cable television commenced a civil action against NDS and Tarnovsky. Tarnovsky was alleged to have extracted the source code of a SECA card and then on 26 March 1999 uploaded it to a file sharing website. A jury later largely cleared NDS and Tarnovsky.

In 2007, Tarnovsky was dismissed from NDS for copyright infringement while in their employ. Tarnovsky denies this accusation.

In 2008, Tarnovsky hacked a Trusted Platform Module, a type of chip used in the Xbox 360 for example, after nine months of study.

In 2010, at a Black Hat Washington DC conference, Tarnovsky described how he had used acid, an electron microscope and small conductive needles to hack the Infineon SLE66 CL PE chip.
