= Hengzhi chip =

Type of secure cryptoprocessors

- Invented by: People's Republic of China
- Common manufacturers: Lenovo

The Hengzhi chip (Chinese: 恒智; pinyin: héngzhì) is a microcontroller that can store secured information, designed by the People's Republic of China government and manufactured in China. Its functionalities should be similar to those offered by a Trusted Platform Module but, unlike the TPM, it does not follow Trusted Computing Group specifications. Lenovo is selling PCs installed with Hengzhi security chips. The chip could be a development of the IBM ESS (Embedded security subsystem) chip, which was a public key smart card placed directly on the motherboard's system management bus. As of September 2006, no public specifications about the chip are available.

The Hengzhi chip has caused issues with the installation of Windows 11 as it doesn't follow the TPM standards and foreign TPMs are banned in China.

== See also ==
- Trusted Computing
- Trusted Platform Module
