= Surface Book 2 =

2-in-1 PC by Microsoft

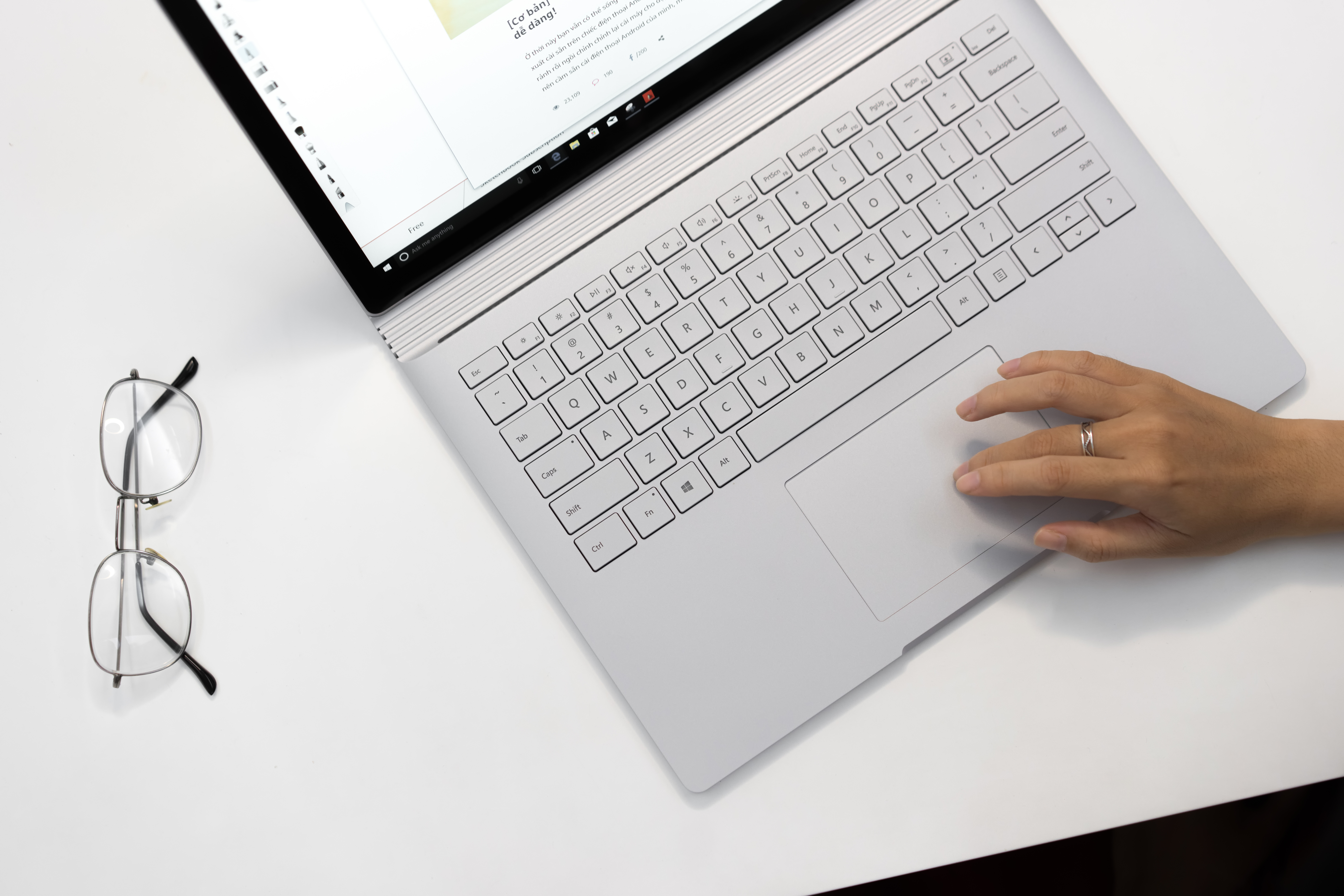
- Developer: Microsoft
- Product family: Microsoft Surface
- Type: 2-in-1 PC
- Generation: 2
- Released: November 16, 2017
- Operating system: Windows 10 Pro
- CPU: 13.5": Intel Core i5-7300U dual-core, Intel Core i5-8350U quad-core, Intel Core i7-8650U quad-core 15": Intel Core i7-8650U quad-core
- Memory: 13.5": 8 or 16 GB LPDDR3 RAM; 15": 16 GB LPDDR3 RAM
- Storage: SSD: 128 GB, 256 GB, 512 GB, 1 TB
- Removable storage: Full-size SD card slot (supports SDXC UHS-1 cards)
- Display: 13.5": 13.5 in (34 cm), 3000×2000 (267 PPI) LCD; 15": 15 in (38 cm), 3240×2160 (260 PPI) LCD
- Graphics: 13.5": Intel HD Graphics 620 or NVIDIA GeForce GTX 1050 with 2GB of GDDR5 RAM; 15": NVIDIA GeForce GTX 1060 with 6GB of GDDR5 RAM
- Sound: Stereo speakers, dual microphones, headset jack
- Input: Keyboard, touchpad mouse, stylus pen, sensors: accelerometer, gyroscope, magnetometer, ambient light, Surface Dial
- Camera: 5.0 MP front, 8.0 MP rear 1080p HD video recording
- Dimensions: 13.5": 12.3 in (31 cm) (length); 9.4 in (24 cm) (width); 0.51 to 0.90 in (1.3 to 2.3 cm) (depth); 15": 13.5 in (34 cm) (length); 9.87 in (25.1 cm) (width); 0.568 to 0.90 in (1.44 to 2.29 cm) (depth)
- Weight: 13.5": i5: 3.38 pounds (1,530 g) i7: 3.62 pounds (1,640 g); 15": 4.2 pounds (1,900 g)
- Predecessor: Surface Book
- Successor: Surface Book 3
- Website: Surface.com

The Surface Book 2 is a 2-in-1 convertible laptop developed by Microsoft as part of its Surface line of personal computers. Released on November 16, 2017, it improved upon its predecessor, the original Surface Book, with enhanced performance, expanded hardware options, and introduction of a larger 15-inch model alongside the original 13.5-inch. In addition to functioning as a traditional laptop, the Surface Book's detachable touchscreen display allows it to be used as a standalone tablet or reattached in reverse for a convertible "Studio" mode. The device supports full touch and stylus input. The Surface Book 2 was succeeded by the third-generation Surface Book 3 in May 2020, and Microsoft officially ended firmware and driver updates on May 30, 2023, marking the end of official support.

== Features ==
=== Hardware ===
The Surface Book 2 features a full-body magnesium alloy construction. The device comes in two distinct portions: a tablet that contains the CPU, storage, wireless connectivity and touchscreen, and a hardware keyboard base that contains a high-performance mobile GPU, supported by its own active cooling system.

The device contains two USB 3.0 Gen-1 ports, a USB-C port, 3.5 mm headphone jack, full-sized SD card slot, and two Surface Connect ports (one of which is always occupied by the keyboard base for communication between the two hardware portions, unless the tablet is detached from the base). The front-facing camera contains an infrared sensor that supports login using Windows Hello.

From a hardware perspective, this device marks Microsoft's first time to provide USB-C natively in any Surface device, also supporting USB-C Power Delivery. It was the only Surface computer equipped with USB-C until Microsoft's introduction of the Surface Go, in August 2018.

Surface Book 2 Configuration Options
| Price Tier (USD) | Size | CPU | GPU | RAM | Internal storage |
|---|---|---|---|---|---|
| 1,149 | 13.5" | Intel Core i5-7300U (2.6 to 3.5 GHz) | Intel HD Graphics 620 | 8GB | 128 GB |
| 1,299 | 13.5" | Intel Core i5-7300U (2.6 to 3.5 GHz) | Intel HD Graphics 620 | 8GB | 256 GB |
| 1,499 | 13.5" | Intel Core i5-8350U (1.7 to 3.6 GHz) | Intel HD Graphics 620 | 8GB | 256 GB |
| 1,699 | 13.5" | Intel Core i7-8650U (1.9 to 4.2 GHz) | Intel HD Graphics 620 | 8GB | 256 GB |
| 1,999 | 13.5" | Intel Core i7-8650U (1.9 to 4.2 GHz) | Intel UHD Graphics 620 + NVIDIA GeForce GTX 1050 | 8GB | 256 GB |
| 2,499 | 13.5" | Intel Core i7-8650U (1.9 to 4.2 GHz) | Intel UHD Graphics 620 + NVIDIA GeForce GTX 1050 | 16GB | 512 GB |
| 2,999 | 13.5" | Intel Core i7-8650U (1.9 to 4.2 GHz) | Intel UHD Graphics 620 + NVIDIA GeForce GTX 1050 | 16GB | 1 TB |
| 1,999 | 15" | Intel Core i5-8350U (1.7 to 3.6 GHz) | Intel HD Graphics 620 | 16 GB | 256 GB |
| 2,499 | 15" | Intel Core i7-8650U (1.9 to 4.2 GHz) | Intel UHD Graphics 620 + NVIDIA GeForce GTX 1060 | 16 GB | 256 GB |
| 2,899 | 15" | Intel Core i7-8650U (1.9 to 4.2 GHz) | Intel UHD Graphics 620 + NVIDIA GeForce GTX 1060 | 16 GB | 512 GB |
| 3,299 | 15" | Intel Core i7-8650U (1.9 to 4.2 GHz) | Intel UHD Graphics 620 + NVIDIA GeForce GTX 1060 | 16 GB | 1 TB |

=== Software ===
Surface Book 2 models ship with a pre-installed 64-bit version of Windows 10 Pro and a 30-day trial of Microsoft Office 365. Windows 10 comes pre-installed with Mail, Calendar, People, Xbox (app), Photos, Movies and TV, Groove, and Microsoft Edge. With Windows 10 the Tablet mode is available when the base is detached from the device. In this mode, all windows are opened full-screen and the interface becomes more touch-centric.

=== Accessories ===
The Surface Book 2 is backward-compatible with all accessories of its direct predecessors, such as the Surface Dock, Surface Dial and Surface Pen. The device's native pen computing capabilities are based on N-trig technology Microsoft acquired in 2015, but major improvements were made to reduce input latency, add tilt support, and capture up to 4096 levels of pressure sensitivity. Following the device's general public launch, Microsoft has also published a series of software updates that further improved the device's palm rejection and pen computing accuracy.

Timeline of Surface devices
Sources: Microsoft Devices Blog Microsoft Surface Store Microsoft Surface for Business store

== Reception ==
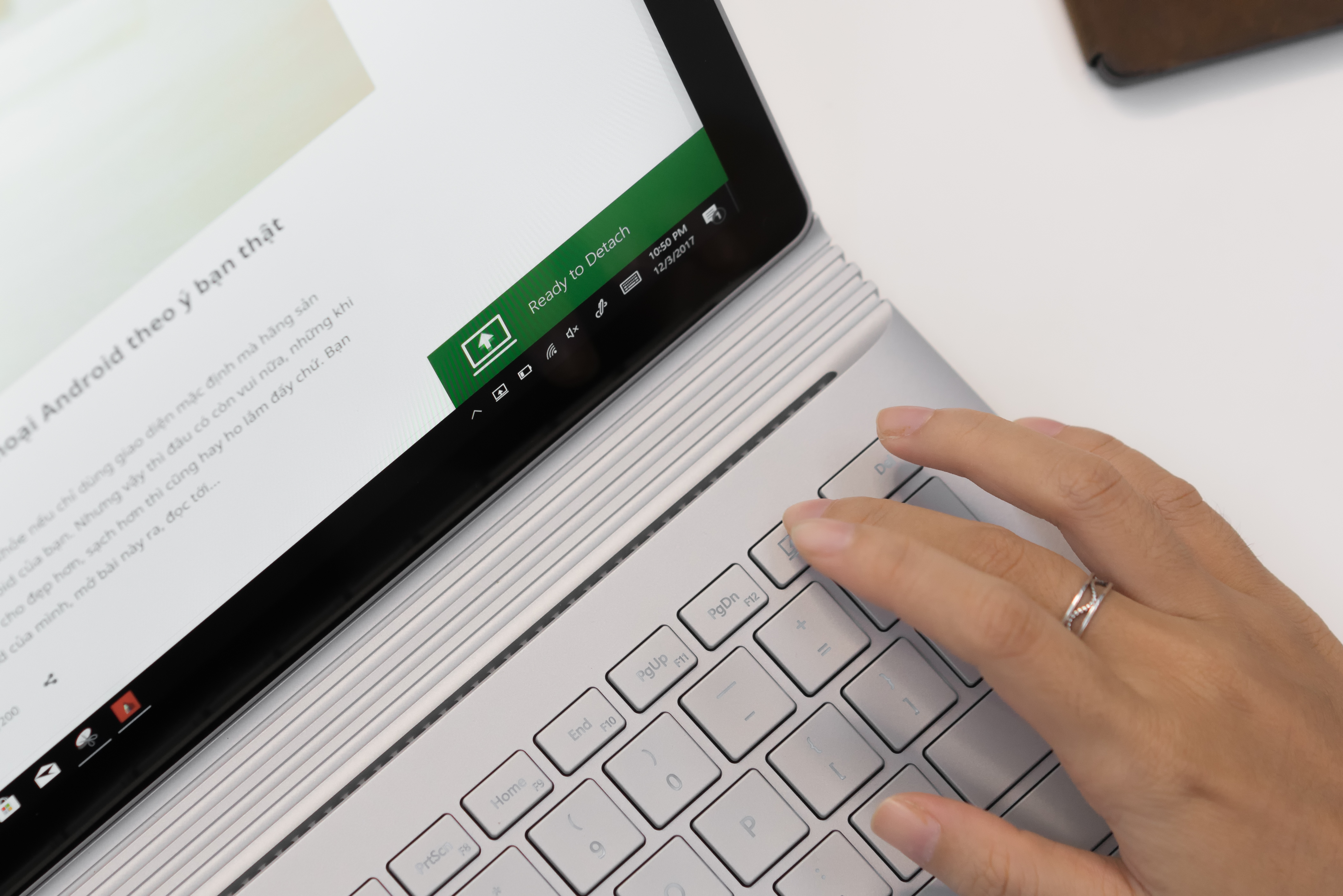
Detach button on the Surface Book 2

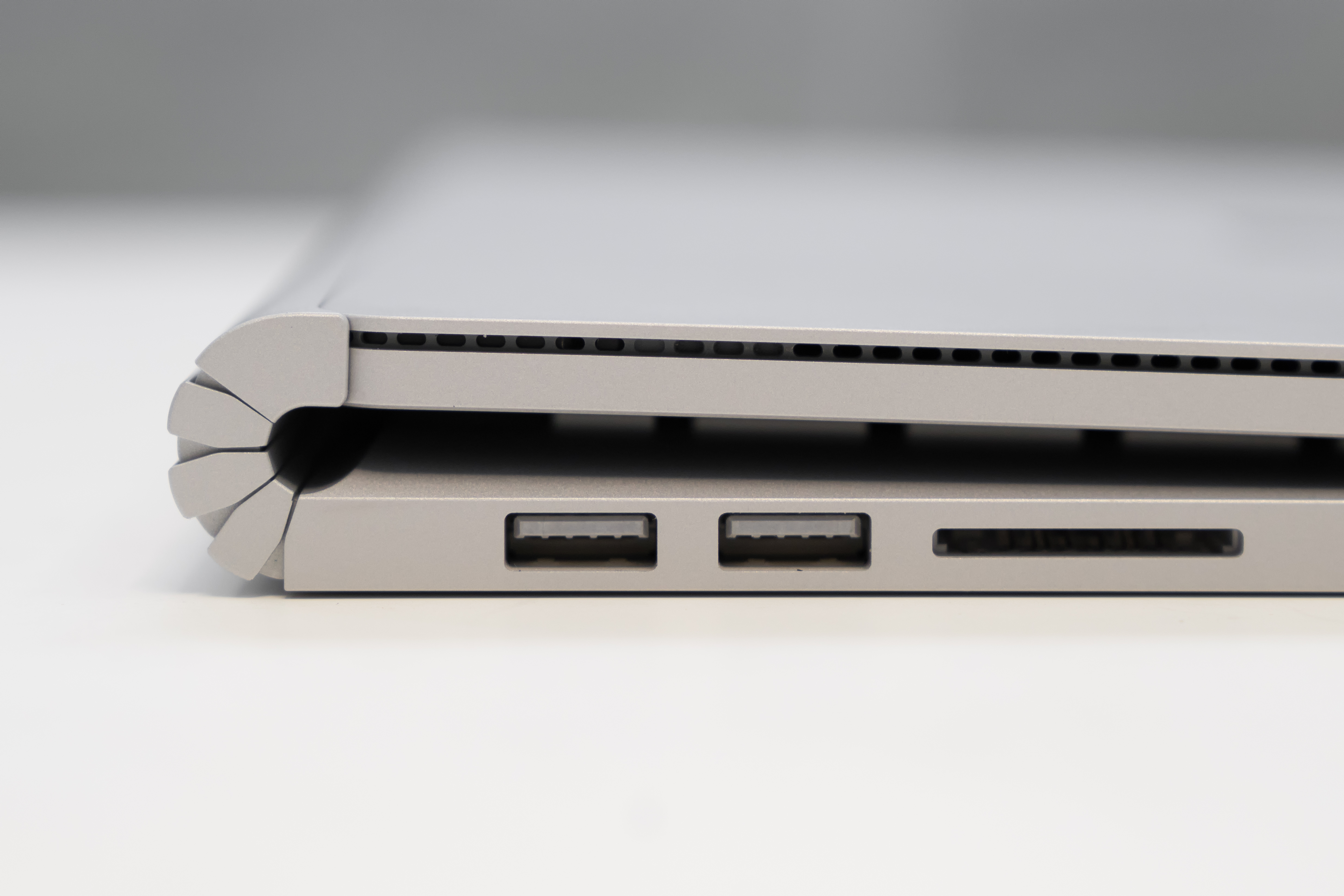
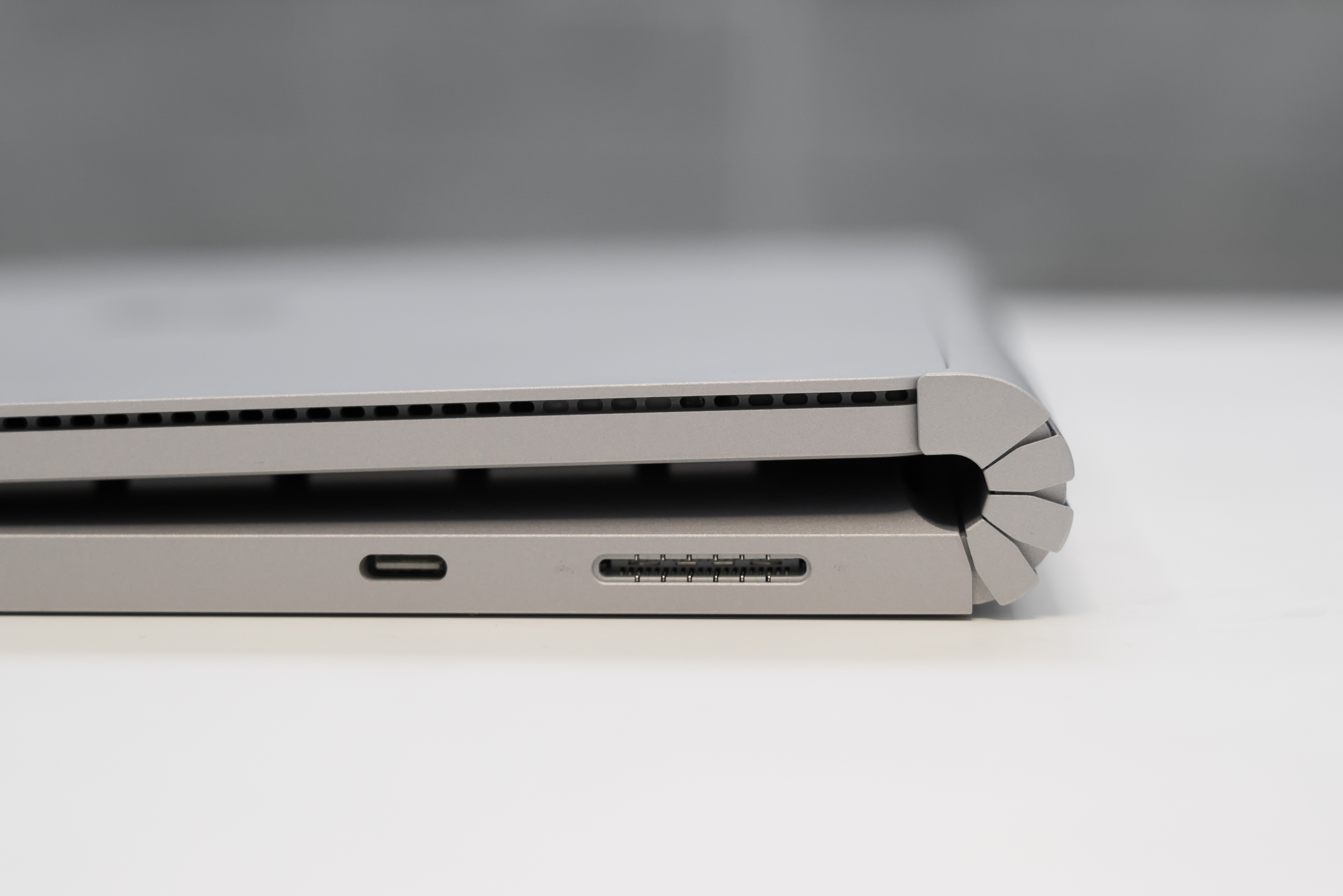
Available ports on the two sides of the keyboard

The Surface Book 2 received broadly positive reviews, often compared favorably to Apple's MacBook Pro lineup. Most reviews applauded the Surface Book 2's keyboard for offering a class-leading 1.55 mm of key travel, significant performance improvement, well-controlled thermals, and new hinge - now redesigned and built as one singular component that increased device rigidity, improved overall docking reliability, and reduced screen wobble.

Other improvements include an improved IR camera that activates faster and supports enhanced anti-spoofing Windows Hello facial recognition, a faster solid-state drive with full drive encryption from first-boot, a built-in TPM chip, and two new cooling systems (for the CPU and GPU) that produce less high-pitched noise. The finger scoop has also been reshaped to avoid breaking the glass screen when the lid is being closed, which is a problem its predecessor suffered.

Devindra Hardawar of Engadget said of the 15-inch model, "The Surface Book 2 is exactly what we've wanted from a high-end Microsoft laptop. It's powerful, sturdy and its unique hinge doesn't come with any compromises." Hardawar also directly compared the Surface Book 2 to Apple's Macbook Pro saying, "It's the closest a PC maker has come to taking on the MacBook Pro, both in style and substance."

Tom Warren, of The Verge, also gave the Surface Book 2 positive notice, praising its performance, keyboard, and touchpad. He did, however, express reservations about the hardware design being largely unchanged, noting "I’d still like to see Microsoft refine the design more to address the hinge and screen wobble fully, and pack in a better power supply. It’s surprising to see the same design after two years, and I was expecting bigger refinements and changes."

== Issues ==
The Surface Book 2 faced a number of early production issues when it was first launched in November 2017, including defective operating system images, split key caps, misaligned hinges, overuse of adhesives surrounding the tablet screen, and coil whine when under load. Most issues were gradually resolved as production continued.

One issue that remains unfixed, however, is battery drain during high intensity workloads. When the 15-inch Surface Book 2 is set to "Best Performance" in the Windows 10 operating system power settings, specific scenarios like extensive gaming or video transcoding could lead to high usage across both the CPU and GPU, and cause the device to draw over 105 W of power. This would unavoidably lead to battery drain until depletion. This issue first appeared in review units shipped to reviewers and other outlets, all of which were accompanied with official 95-watt power supplies.

| Preceded by Surface Book | Surface Book; 2nd generation | Succeeded by Surface Book 3 |
