= Nuvoton =

Taiwanese semiconductor manufacturer

Nuvoton Technology Corp.
- Trade name: Nuvoton
- Native name: 新唐科技股份有限公司
- Type: Public
- Traded as: TWSE: 4919
- Industry: Semiconductor
- Founded: 2008; 18 years ago
- Headquarters: Hsinchu Science and Industrial Park, Hsinchu, Taiwan
- Key people: Arthur Yu-Cheng Chiao, Chairman; Yuan-Mou Su, CEO
- Products: Microcontroller application integrated circuits (ICs); Audio application ICs; Cloud & computing ICs
- Services: Foundry
- Number of employees: 1,678
- Subsidiaries: Nuvoton Electronics Technology (H.K.) Limited; Nuvoton Electronics Technology (Shanghai) Limited; Nuvoton Electronics Technology (Shenzhen) Limited; Nuvoton Technology Corp. America; Nuvoton Technology Israel Ltd.; Nuvoton Technology India Private Limited; Nuvoton Technology Germany GmbH; Nuvoton Technology Corporation Japan; Nuvoton Technology Korea Limited; Nuvoton Technology Singapore Pte. Ltd.
- Website: https://www.nuvoton.com/

Nuvoton Technology Corporation (Chinese: 新唐科技股份有限公司) is a Taiwanese semiconductor company established in 2008. It originated as a wholly owned subsidiary of Winbond Electronics Corp. before becoming an independent entity. It became a public company in September 2010 on the Taiwan Stock Exchange (TWSE).

== Overview ==
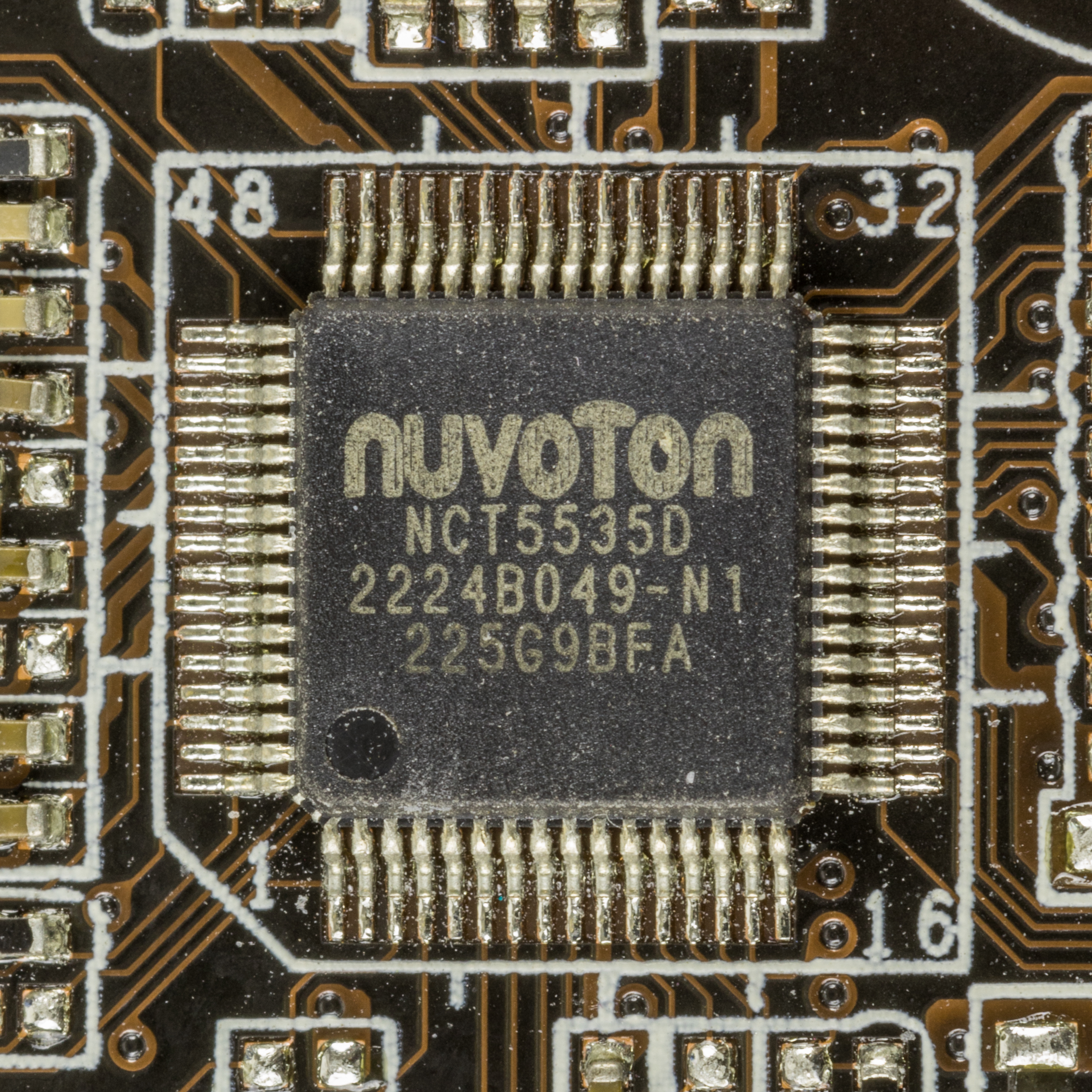
A Nuvoton NCT5535D microchip on an ASUS Motherboard.

Nuvoton develops and manufactures various semiconductor products, including microcontroller application integrated circuits (ICs) for audio, cloud and computing. Nuvoton also provides foundry services. The company's consumer electronics ICs focus on microcontroller ICs and voice and speech ICs. Nuvoton designs and manufactures key chips for PC motherboards, laptops, and servers, offering super I/O components, clock generators, hardware monitoring, power management ICs. Notebook keyboard controllers, embedded controllers for mobile platforms and TPM security chips.

Nuvoton operates a six-inch wafer fab, providing foundry services for its own branded IC products and for manufacturing partners.

== History ==
In September 2020, Nuvoton completed the acquisition of Panasonic's chip unit for $250 million in an all-cash transaction. This strategic move aimed to enhance Nuvoton's presence in the automobile and automation industries.

== See also ==
- List of companies of Taiwan
- ARM architecture
