= Winbond =

Taiwanese flash memory manufacturer

Winbond Electronics Corporation 華邦電子公司
- Company type: Corporation
- Industry: Semiconductors
- Founded: 1987; 39 years ago
- Headquarters: Taichung, Taiwan
- Key people: Arthur Yu-Cheng Chiao (Chairman & CEO); Tung-Yi Chan (President)
- Products: Mobile DRAM; Specialty DRAM; Flash memory
- Website: www.winbond.com

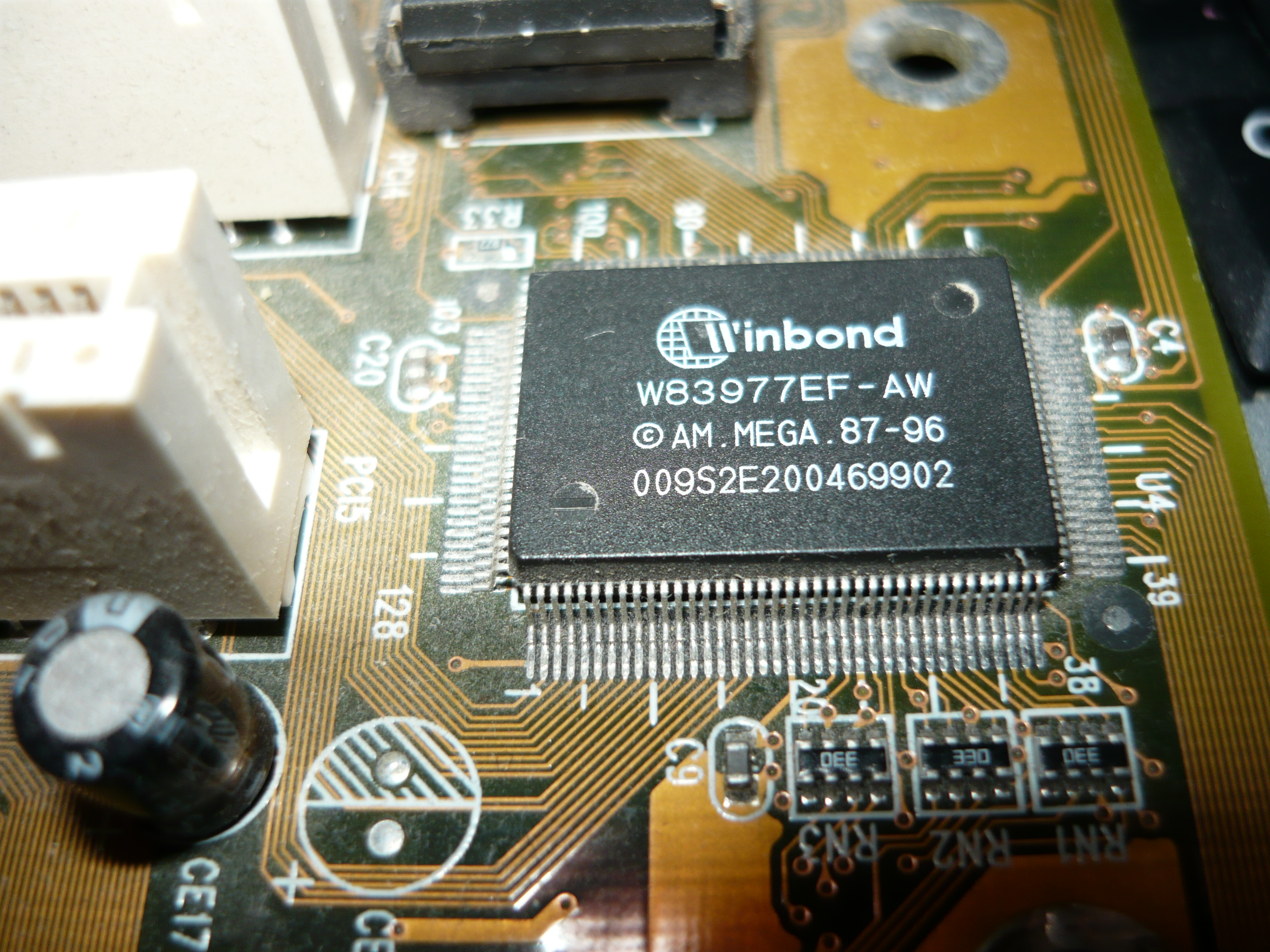
A Winbond Super I/O chip on a desktop PC motherboard

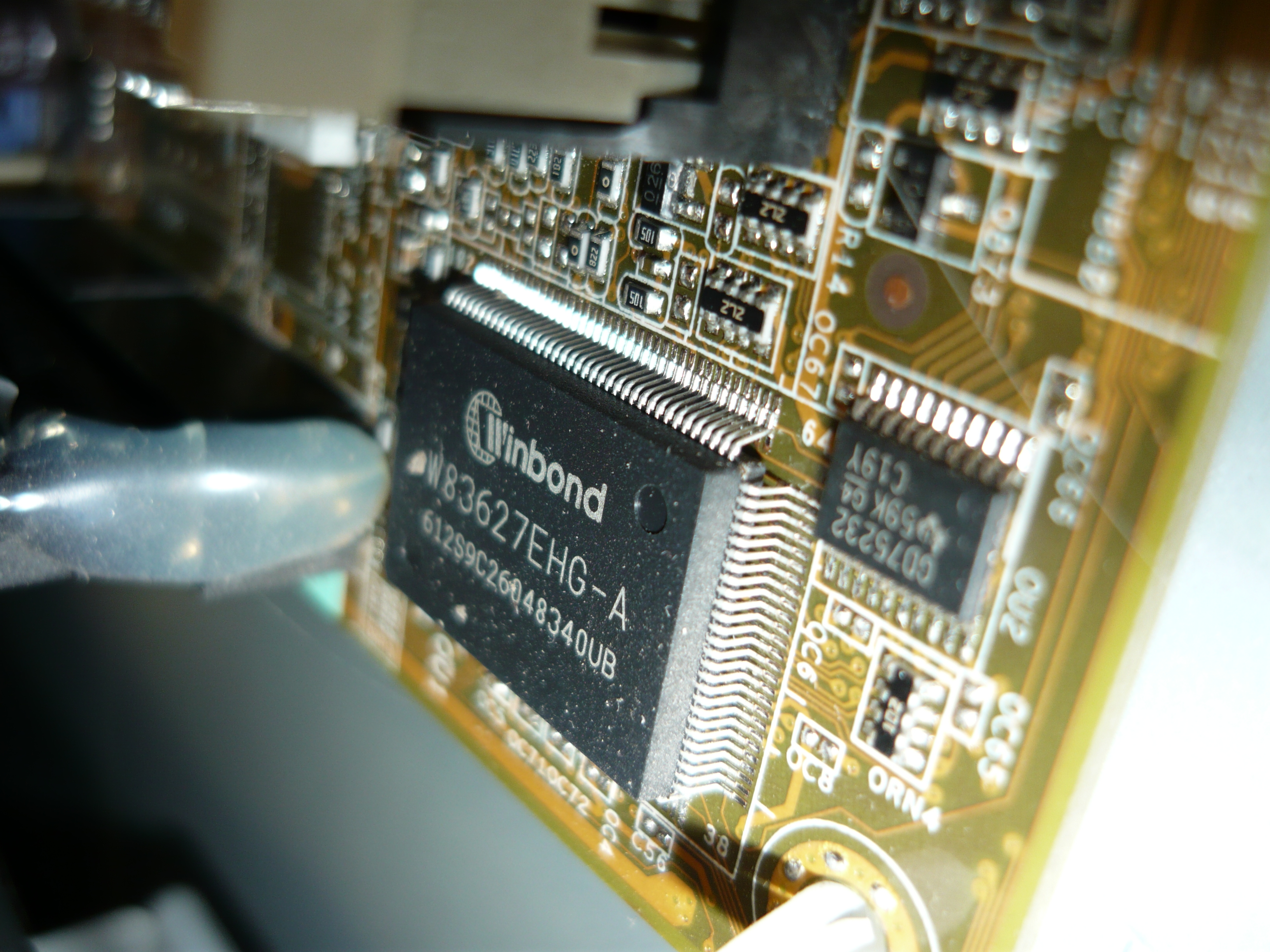
A Winbond controller

Winbond Electronics Corporation (Chinese: 華邦電子公司; pinyin: Huábāng Diànzǐ Gōngsī) is a Taiwan-based corporation founded in 1987. It produces semiconductors and several types of integrated circuits (ICs) including dynamic random-access memory, static random-access memory, serial flash, microcontrollers, and Super I/O chips.

== History ==
Winbond was established in 1987 in Hsinchu Science Park in Taiwan. Its founder came from the Industrial Technology Research Institute. From 1987 to 1988 J.J Pan and Partners designed and constructed a fabrication plant known as IC Wafer Fab I Plant. This facility would produce 6 inch wafers. It was designed and constructed in 14 months. Later in 1989 to 1992, J.J Pan and Partners built a second fab for Winbond called IC Wafer Fab II Plant.

In 1992 Winbond joined the Precision RISC Organization and licensed HP's PA-RISC architecture to design and manufacture chips for X terminals and printers.

Winbond acquired affiliated chipset maker Symphony Laboratories, of San Jose, California, in October 1995.

Winbond was affected by power cuts caused by the 1999 Jiji earthquake forcing the company to pause manufacturing. By 2002 Winbond had 4,000 employees. In 2004 Winbond was said to have a "continuous-learning culture", having 1,200 training programs for its employees. In August 2004, Infineon announced a deal with Winbond to build a factory to make DRAM.

The computer IC, consumer electronics IC, and logic product foundry divisions of Winbond were spun off as Nuvoton Technology Corporation on 1 July 2008.

In 2010 Winbond was manufacturing DDR2 DRAM using technology licensed from Qimonda.

In 2019 Karamba Security partnered with Winbond to make secure embedded flash products. In 2023 Winbond joined the Universal Chiplet Interconnect Express Consortium.

== See also ==
- List of semiconductor fabrication plants
- List of companies of Taiwan
