= Hardware certification =

Process for testing computer hardware

Hardware certification is the process through which computer hardware is tested to ensure it is compatible with specific software packages, and operates as intended in critical situations. With ever dropping prices of hardware devices, the market for networking devices and systems is undergoing a kind of change that can be loosely termed as "generalization." Big established enterprises like Cisco, Novell, Sun Microsystems, etc., no longer manufacture all the hardware required in the market, instead they "license" or "certify" small hardware players operating in countries like Taiwan or China.

== Certification process ==
=== Vendor certification ===
To obtain certification, the hardware or software has to conform to a set of protocols and quality standards that are put in place by the original creator of technology. Usually the certification process is done by a "certification partner." Certification partners are selected by the original creators of the technology and these partners are given the authority to do the testing and certification process. After a product is found to be compatible, it is labelled as xxx certified where xxx is the name of the original creator of the technology. Vendors use a "label" on the products to advertise the fact of compatibility with the said technology.

The process of certification ensures that the products made by different manufacturers are standardized and are compatible with each other as indicated in hardware or software platform.

=== Third-party certification ===
Third-party certification is undertaken by an independent body. To obtain third-party certification, the hardware or software has to confirm to a set of quality standards determined by the third-party.
