= Stackless Python =

Alternative Python implementation

- Original author: Christian Tismer
- Developer: Anselm Kruis
- Release: 1998; 28 years ago
- Stable release: 3.8.1-slp / January 22, 2020; 6 years ago
- Preview release: 3.9.0 alpha 0
- Written in: C, Python
- Operating system: Linux, macOS, Windows
- Type: Interpreter
- License: Python Software Foundation License
- Website: github.com/stackless-dev
- Repository: github.com/stackless-dev/stackless

Stackless Python, or Stackless, is a discontinued Python programming language interpreter. Its GitHub repository has been archived since February 2025, and the project has been officially discontinued.

It was so named because it avoids depending on the C call stack for its own stack. In practice, Stackless Python uses the C stack, but the stack is cleared between function calls. The most prominent feature of Stackless is microthreads, which avoid much of the overhead associated with usual operating system threads. In addition to Python features, Stackless also adds support for coroutines, communication channels, and task serialization.

The MMORPG game EVE Online is one of the major users of Stackless Python, since 2003 (with Python 2.1, then 2.3, 2.5, 2.7), and the company behind it Fenris Creations (previously CCP Games) one of the main contributor to it, but started to move away from it, i.e. started migration to Python 3 in 2026 (in the meantime they open sourced the game engine, and one part is a component "designed to match that of Stackless Python as closely as possible" though it diverges also).

== Design ==
With Stackless Python, a running program is split into microthreads that are managed by the language interpreter itself, not the operating system kernel—context switching and task scheduling is done purely in the interpreter (these are thus also regarded as a form of green thread). Microthreads manage the execution of different subtasks in a program on the same CPU core. Thus, they are an alternative to event-based asynchronous programming and also avoid the overhead of using separate threads for single-core programs (because no mode switching between user mode and kernel mode needs to be done, so CPU usage can be reduced).

Although microthreads make it easier to deal with running subtasks on a single core, Stackless Python does not remove CPython's global interpreter lock (GIL), nor does it use multiple threads and/or processes. So it allows only cooperative multitasking on a shared CPU and not parallelism (preemption was originally not available but is now in some form). To use multiple CPU cores, one would still need to build an interprocess communication system on top of Stackless Python processes.

Due to the considerable number of changes in the source, Stackless Python cannot be installed on a preexisting Python installation as an extension or library. It is instead a complete Python distribution in itself. The majority of Stackless's features have also been implemented in PyPy, a self-hosting Python interpreter and JIT compiler.

== Use ==
Although the whole Stackless is a separate distribution, its switching functionality has been successfully packaged as a CPython extension called greenlet. It is used by a number of libraries (e.g. gevent) to provide a green threading solution for CPython. Python since has received an alternative native solution for asynchronous programming running on a single thread: await/async.

Stackless is used extensively in the implementation of the Eve Online massively multiplayer online game as well as in IronPort's mail platform.

== See also ==
- Erlang (programming language)
- Limbo (programming language)
- Go (programming language)
- SCOOP (software)
