= Setjmp.h =

Header file for C programs

<setjmp.h> is a header defined in the C standard library to provide "non-local jumps": control flow that deviates from the usual subroutine call and return sequence. The complementary functions setjmp and longjmp provide this functionality.

A typical use of setjmp/longjmp is implementation of an exception mechanism that exploits the ability of longjmp to reestablish program or thread state, even across multiple levels of function calls. A less common use of setjmp is to create syntax similar to coroutines.

== Member functions ==
int setjmp(jmp_buf env)
Sets up the local jmp_buf buffer and initializes it for the jump. This routine saves the program's calling environment in the environment buffer specified by the env argument for later use by longjmp. If the return is from a direct invocation, setjmp returns 0. If the return is from a call to longjmp, setjmp returns a nonzero value.
void longjmp(jmp_buf env, int value)
Restores the context of the environment buffer env that was saved by invocation of the setjmp routine in the same invocation of the program. Invoking longjmp from a nested signal handler is undefined. The value specified by value is passed from longjmp to setjmp. After longjmp is completed, program execution continues as if the corresponding invocation of setjmp had just returned. If the value passed to longjmp is 0, setjmp will behave as if it had returned 1; otherwise, it will behave as if it had returned value.

setjmp saves the current environment (the program state), at some point of program execution, into a platform-specific data structure (jmp_buf) that can be used at some later point of program execution by longjmp to restore the program state to that saved by setjmp into jmp_buf. This process can be imagined to be a "jump" back to the point of program execution where setjmp saved the environment. The (apparent) return value from setjmp indicates whether control reached that point normally (zero) or from a call to longjmp (nonzero). This leads to a common idiom: if (setjmp(x)) { /* handle longjmp(x) */ }.

POSIX.1 does not specify whether setjmp and longjmp save and restore the current set of blocked signals; if a program employs signal handling it should use POSIX's sigsetjmp/siglongjmp.

== Member types ==
jmp_buf
An array type suitable for holding the information needed to restore a calling environment.

The C99 Rationale describes jmp_buf as being an array type for backward compatibility; existing code refers to jmp_buf storage locations by name (without the & address-of operator), which is only possible for array types. It notes that it can simply be a one-member-long array with its single member being the actual data; indeed, this is the approach employed by the GNU C library, which defines the type as struct __jmp_buf_tag[1].

== Caveats and limitations ==
When a "non-local goto" is executed via setjmp/longjmp in C++, normal "stack unwinding" does not occur. Therefore, any required cleanup actions will not occur either. This could include closing file descriptors, flushing buffers, or freeing heap-allocated memory.

If the function in which setjmp was called returns, it is no longer possible to safely use longjmp with the corresponding jmp_buf object. This is because the stack frame is invalidated when the function returns. Calling longjmp restores the stack pointer, which—because the function returned—would point to a non-existent and potentially overwritten or corrupted stack frame.

Similarly, C99 does not require that longjmp preserve the current stack frame. This means that jumping into a function which was exited via a call to longjmp is undefined.

== Example usage ==
=== Simple example ===
The example below shows the basic idea of setjmp. There, main() calls first(), which in turn calls second(). Then, second() jumps back into main(), skipping first()'s call of printf().

#include <setjmp.h>
#include <stdio.h>

static jmp_buf buf;

void second() {
    printf("second\n"); // prints
    longjmp(buf, 1); // jumps back to where setjmp was called - making setjmp now return 1
}

void first() {
    second();
    printf("first\n"); // does not print
}

int main() {
    if (!setjmp(buf)) {
        first(); // when executed, setjmp returned 0
    } else { // when longjmp jumps back, setjmp returns 1
        printf("main\n"); // prints
    }

    return 0;
}

When executed, the above program will output:

second
main

Notice that although the first() subroutine gets called, "first" is never printed, as second() never returns control to first(). Instead, "main" is printed when the conditional statement if (!setjmp(buf)) is checked a second time.

=== Exception handling ===
In this example, setjmp is used to bracket exception handling, like try in some other languages. The call to longjmp is analogous to a throw statement, allowing an exception to return an error status directly to the setjmp. The following code adheres to the 1999 ISO C standard and Single UNIX Specification by invoking setjmp in a limited range of contexts:

- As the condition to an if, switch or iteration statement
- As above in conjunction with a single ! or comparison with an integer constant
- As a statement (with the return value unused)

Following these rules can make it easier for the implementation to create the environment buffer, which can be a sensitive operation. More general use of setjmp can cause undefined behaviour, such as corruption of local variables; conforming compilers and environments are not required to protect or even warn against such usage. However, slightly more sophisticated idioms such as switch ((exception_type = setjmp(env))) { } are common in literature and practice, and remain relatively portable. A simple conforming methodology is presented below, where an additional variable is maintained along with the state buffer. This variable could be elaborated into a structure incorporating the buffer itself.

In a more modern-looking example, the usual "try" block would be implemented as a setjmp (with some preparation code for multilevel jumps, as seen in first), the "throw" as longjmp with the optional parameter as the exception, and the "catch" as the "else" block under "try".

#include <setjmp.h>
#include <stdio.h>
#include <stdlib.h>
#include <string.h>

static void first();
static void second();

/* Use a file scoped static variable for the exception stack so we can access
 * it anywhere within this translation unit. */
static jmp_buf exception_env;
static int exception_type;

int main(void) {
    volatile char* mem_buffer = NULL;

    if (setjmp(exception_env)) {
        // if we get here there was an exception
        printf("first failed, exception type: %d\n", exception_type);
    } else {
        // Run code that may signal failure via longjmp.
        puts("calling first");
        first();

        mem_buffer = (char*)malloc(300); // allocate a resource
        printf("%s\n", strcpy(mem_buffer, "first succeeded")); // not reached
    }

    free(mem_buffer); // NULL can be passed to free, no operation is performed

    return 0;
}

static void first() {
    jmp_buf my_env;

    puts("entering first"); // reached

    memcpy(my_env, exception_env, sizeof my_env); // store value of exception_env in my_env since exception_env will be reused

    switch (setjmp(exception_env)) {
        case 3: // if we get here there was an exception.
            printf("second failed, exception type: 3; remapping to type 1");
            exception_type = 1;

        default: // fall through
            memcpy(exception_env, my_env, sizeof exception_env); // restore exception stack
            longjmp(exception_env, exception_type); // continue handling the exception

        case 0: // normal, desired operation
            printf("calling second"); // reached 
            second();
            printf("second succeeded"); // not reached
    }

    memcpy(exception_env, my_env, sizeof exception_env); // restore exception stack

    puts("leaving first"); // never reached
}

static void second() {
    printf("entering second" ); // reached

    exception_type = 3;
    longjmp(exception_env, exception_type); // declare that the program has failed

    printf("leaving second"); // not reached
}

This program's output is:

calling first
entering first
calling second
entering second
second failed, exception type: 3; remapping to type 1
first failed, exception type: 1

=== Cooperative multitasking ===
C99 provides that longjmp is guaranteed to work only when the destination is a calling function, i.e., that the destination scope is guaranteed to be intact. Jumping to a function that has already terminated by return or longjmp is undefined. However, most implementations of longjmp do not specifically destroy local variables when performing the jump. Since the context survives until its local variables are erased, it could actually be restored by setjmp. In many environments (such as Really Simple Threads and TinyTimbers), idioms such as if (!setjmp(child_env)) longjmp(caller_env); can allow a called function to effectively pause-and-resume at a setjmp.

This is exploited by thread libraries to provide cooperative multitasking facilities without using setcontext or other fiber facilities.

Considering that setjmp to a child function will generally work unless sabotaged, and setcontext, as part of POSIX, is not required to be provided by C implementations, this mechanism may be portable where the setcontext alternative fails.

Since no exception will be generated upon overflow of one of the multiple stacks in such a mechanism, it is essential to overestimate the space required for each context, including the one containing main() and including space for any signal handlers that might interrupt regular execution. Exceeding the allocated space will corrupt the other contexts, usually with the outermost functions first. Unfortunately, systems requiring this kind of programming strategy are often also small ones with limited resources.

#include <setjmp.h>
#include <stdio.h>

jmp_buf mainTask, childTask;

void call_with_cushion();
void child();

int main() {
    if (!setjmp(mainTask)) {
        call_with_cushion(); // child never returns, yield
    } // execution resumes after this "}" after first time that child yields

    while (true) {
        printf("Parent\n");
        
        if (!setjmp(mainTask)) {
            longjmp(childTask, 1); // yield - note that this is undefined under C99
        }
    }
}

void call_with_cushion() {
    char space[1000]; // Reserve enough space for main to run
    space[999] = 1; // Do not optimize array out of existence
    child();
}

void child() {
    while (true) {
        printf("Child loop begin\n");
        
        if (!setjmp(childTask)) {
            longjmp(mainTask, 1); // yield - invalidates childTask in C99
        }

        printf("Child loop end\n");

        if (!setjmp(childTask)) {
            longjmp(mainTask, 1); // yield - invalidates childTask in C99
        }
    }

    /* Don't return. Instead we should set a flag to indicate that main()
       should stop yielding to us and then longjmp(mainTask, 1) */
}
