= Saguaro (Palm OS) =

Saguaro was an application for Palm OS, one of the first designed to give Palm-OS-based PDAs true multitasking features comparable to desktop computers. Saguaro was also the first Palm OS application capable of competing with the graphic performance of the iPhone.

== History ==
Saguaro, produced by PDA Performance, Inc., had a long development cycle of three years. Currently, the full version is not available for download, however, two beta versions had been released: Saguaro Beta (a private beta) and Saguaro Sneak Peek (a public beta). Information about the Saguaro private beta is severely lacking, however it is speculated to be more full-featured than the public beta. PDA Performance released lineUp, an application based on Saguaro’s code, on November 30, 2007.

PDA Performance announced their closure on February 28, 2008. As a result, a complete version of Saguaro has not been released.

== Specifications ==
Little data is available on the technical specifications of Saguaro, as PDA Performance had not released an SDK. Saguaro was rumored to implement cooperative multitasking for Saguaro-compatible applications, referred to as "widgets". The term caused speculation in the Palm community as to whether Saguaro was intended to replace the Palm OS to run applications or if it was designed to be a widget engine. Saguaro was also rumored to be capable of running "legacy" palm applications by acting as a launcher.

Saguaro featured its own graphics engine, called "MojaveGL", which also functioned as a window manager. MojaveGL is capable of alpha blending, thus allowing Saguaro to create translucent windows.

== LineUp ==
LineUp is a widget engine developed by PDA Performance that is heavily based on Saguaro's code. LineUp has relatively few widgets available, of which most are news-based (CNN, CNET, Washington Post, etc). An SDK has not been released to allow third party developers to create widgets, causing many users to lose interest in the "fancy RSS reader."

LineUp itself is quick and fluid, providing users a preview of Saguaro and the MojaveGL framework on what it is based.
