= Yield =

Yield may refer to:

== Measures of output/function ==
=== Computer science ===
- Yield (multithreading) is an action that occurs in a computer program during multithreading
- See generator (computer programming)

=== Physics/chemistry ===
- Yield (chemistry), the amount of product obtained in a chemical reaction
  - The arrow symbol in a chemical equation
- Yield (engineering), yield strength of a material as defined in engineering and material science
- Fission product yield
- Nuclear weapon yield

=== Earth science ===
- Crop yield, measurement of the amount of a crop harvested, or animal products such as wool, meat or milk produced, per unit area of land
  - Yield (wine), the amount of grapes or wine that is produced per unit surface of vineyard
- Ecological yield, the harvestable population growth of an ecosystem, most commonly measured in forestry and fishery
- Specific yield, a measure of aquifer capacity
- Yield (hydrology), the volume of water escaping from a spring

=== Production/manufacturing ===
- Yield (casting)
- Throughput yield, a manufacturing evaluation method
- A measure of functioning devices in semiconductor testing, see Semiconductor device fabrication § Device yield
- The number of servings provided by a recipe

=== Finance ===
- Yield (finance), a rate of return for a security
- Dividend yield and earnings yield, measures of dividends paid on stock

== Other uses ==
- Yield (college admissions), a statistic describing what percent of applicants choose to enroll
- Yield (album), by Pearl Jam
- Yield sign, a traffic sign
- The Yield, a 2019 novel by Tara June Winch
- In cooking, yield is how many servings a recipe creates.
- Yield, a feature of a coroutine in computer programming.
- Yield, an element of the TV series The Amazing Race
