= Microthread =

Microthreads are functions that may run in parallel to gain increased performance in microprocessors. They provide an execution model that uses a few additional instructions in a conventional processor to break code down into fragments that execute simultaneously. Dependencies are managed by making registers in the microprocessors executing the code synchronising, so one microthread will wait for another to produce data.

This is a form of dataflow. This model can be applied to an existing instruction set architecture incrementally by providing just five new instructions to implement concurrency controls. A set of microthreads is a static partition of a basic block into concurrently executing fragments, which execute on a single processor and share a microcontext. An iterator over a set provides a dynamic and parametric family of microthreads. Iterators capture loop concurrency and can be scheduled to different processors. An iterator over a set is created dynamically and is called a family of microthreads. This is the mechanism that allows the model to generate concurrency, which can be run on multiple processors or functional units.

== See also ==
- Continuation
- Coroutine
- Fiber (computer science)
- Micro-thread (multi-core)
- Protothread
