= PTH =

PTH may refer to:

== Biology and Medicine ==
- Parathyroid hormone
- phenylthiohydantoin, an amino acid derivative formed by the Edman degradation

== Computing ==
- GNU Portable Threads in computing
- Pass the hash attack in computing

== Languages ==
- Pataxó language, by ISO 639 code
- Standard Chinese, also known as putonghua and abbreviated PTH

== Places ==
- Parsippany-Troy Hills, township in Morris County, New Jersey
- Port Huron (Amtrak station), Michigan, US, station code
- Perth railway station, Scotland, station code
- Provincial Trunk Highway in list of Manitoba provincial highways
- Port Heiden Airport, by IATA code

== Other ==
- Plated through-hole in PCB through-hole technology
- Polskie Towarzystwo Historyczne, the Polish Historical Society
- Protest the Hero, a Canadian progressive metal band
