= Consensus dynamics =

How a group of agents can reach a common decision

Consensus dynamics, also known as agreement dynamics, is an area of research at the intersection of systems theory and graph theory. It studies how a group of agents—such as robots, sensors, or decision-makers—interacting over a network can reach a common decision or estimate through local rules and information exchange. This is known as the consensus problem in multi-agent systems, where the goal is to ensure that all agents eventually agree on a certain quantity, despite starting with potentially different initial values.

Consensus dynamics has applications in areas such as physiological systems, gene regulatory networks, large-scale energy systems, and coordinated control of autonomous vehicle fleets on land, in the air, or in space. The behavior of these systems is typically modeled using an unforced dynamical system governed by the network's interconnection topology and the agents' initial conditions. The consensus protocol, or agreement protocol, defines the rules of interaction that lead to convergence.

Related coordination problems include the rendezvous problem, synchronization, flocking, and formation control. These often rely on similar mathematical foundations and are studied under the broader umbrella of cooperative control. One computational approach to solving these problems is distributed constraint reasoning. Consensus models are also used in social and philosophical domains to analyze how groups reach agreement through debate or deliberation. For example, simulations can evaluate whether introducing a new argument shifts the outcome of a debate by providing an additional truth value.

== See also ==
- Consensus (computer science)
- Cooperative multitasking
