= HammerDB =

Load testing software for databases

- Developer: Steve Shaw
- Stable release: 6.0 / June 26, 2026; 2 months ago
- Available in: English
- Type: Load testing
- License: GPLv3
- Website: www.hammerdb.com
- Repository: github.com/TPC-Council/HammerDB

HammerDB is an open source database benchmarking application developed by Steve Shaw. HammerDB supports databases such as Oracle, SQL Server, Db2, MySQL and MariaDB. HammerDB is written in TCL and C, and is licensed under the GPL v3.

== Features ==
HammerDB is a database load testing and benchmarking tool. HammerDB is used to create a test schema, load it with data and simulate the workload of multiple virtual users against the database for both transactional and analytic scenarios. HammerDB makes it possible to run derived workloads of the industry standard TPROC-C & TPROC-H (known by trademarks TPC-C and TPC-H respectively) so they can compare and contrast systems, databases and database cloud services.

HammerDB supports Oracle Database, Microsoft SQL Server, IBM Db2, TimesTen, MySQL, MariaDB, PostgreSQL, Greenplum, Postgres Plus Advanced Server, Amazon Aurora and Amazon Redshift. HammerDB also includes deprecated workloads for Redis and Apache Trafodion.

HammerDB is developed in the languages TCL and C - this is to avoid a common 'feature' of Python called the Global Interpreter Lock or GIL.

HammerDB is hosted on GitHub by TPC-Council. The Transaction Processing Performance Council (TPC) is described as "a worldwide consortium that establishes standards intended to promote the fast, efficient and reliable execution of e-commerce and database transactions".

== See also ==
- Load testing
- Database testing
- Software performance testing
- Web server benchmarking
