= Run-to-completion scheduling =

Scheduling model

Run-to-completion scheduling or nonpreemptive scheduling is a scheduling model in which each task runs until it either finishes, or explicitly yields control back to the scheduler. Run-to-completion systems typically have an event queue which is serviced either in strict order of admission by an event loop, or by an admission scheduler which is capable of scheduling events out of order, based on other constraints such as deadlines.

Some preemptive multitasking scheduling systems behave as run-to-completion schedulers in regard to scheduling tasks at one particular process priority level, at the same time as those processes still preempt other lower priority tasks and are themselves preempted by higher priority tasks.

== See also ==
- Preemptive multitasking
- Cooperative multitasking
