= Yield (multithreading) =

Concept in multithreading

In computer science, yield is an action that occurs in a computer program during multithreading, of forcing a processor to relinquish control of the current running thread, and sending it to the end of the running queue, of the same scheduling priority.

== Examples ==
Different programming languages implement yielding in various ways.

- pthread_yield() in the language C, a low level implementation, provided by POSIX Threads
- std::this_thread::yield() in the language C++, introduced in C++11.
- The Yield method is provided in various object-oriented programming languages with multithreading support, such as C# and Java. OOP languages generally provide class abstractions for thread objects.
- yield in Kotlin
- sched_yield() in the C standard library, which causes the calling thread to relinquish the CPU.

== In coroutines ==
Coroutines are a fine-grained concurrency primitive, which may be required to yield explicitly. They may enable specifying another function to take control. Coroutines that explicitly yield allow cooperative multitasking.

== See also ==
- Coroutines
- Java (software platform)
- Common Language Runtime
- Java virtual machine
- Actor model
