= GNU Portable Threads =

Thread library

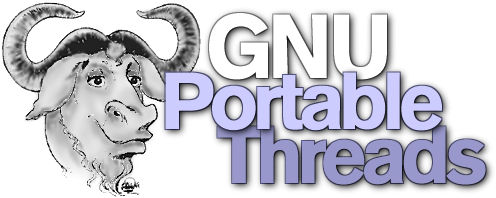
- Original author: Ralf S. Engelschall
- Initial release: July 16, 1999; 26 years ago
- Stable release: 2.0.7 / June 8, 2006; 19 years ago
- Operating system: POSIX
- Type: Runtime library
- License: LGPL
- Website: www.gnu.org/software/pth/

GNU Pth (Portable Threads) is a POSIX/ANSI-C based user space thread library for UNIX platforms that provides priority-based scheduling for multithreading applications. GNU Pth targets for a high degree of portability. It is part of the GNU Project.

Pth also provides API emulation for POSIX threads for backward compatibility.

GNU Pth uses an N:1 mapping to kernel-space threads, i.e., the scheduling is done completely by the GNU Pth library and the kernel itself is not aware of the N threads in user-space. Because of this there is no possibility to utilize SMP as kernel dispatching would be necessary.

== See also ==
- Fiber
