= Preemption (computing) =

Temporarily interrupting a computer task

In computing, preemption is the act performed by an external scheduler — without assistance or cooperation from the task — of temporarily interrupting an executing task, with the intention of resuming it at a later time. This preemptive scheduler usually runs in the most privileged protection ring, meaning that interruption and then resumption are considered highly secure actions. Such changes to the currently executing task of a processor are known as context switching.

== User mode and kernel mode ==
In any given system design, some operations performed by the system may not be preemptable. This usually applies to kernel functions and service interrupts which, if not permitted to run to completion, would tend to produce race conditions resulting in deadlock. Barring the scheduler from preempting tasks while they are processing kernel functions simplifies the kernel design at the expense of system responsiveness. The distinction between user mode and kernel mode, which determines privilege level within the system, may also be used to distinguish whether a task is currently preemptable.

Most modern operating systems have preemptive kernels, which are designed to permit tasks to be preempted even when in kernel mode. Examples of such operating systems are Solaris 2.0/SunOS 5.0, Windows NT, Linux kernel (2.5.4 and newer), AIX and some BSD systems (NetBSD, since version 5).

== Preemptive multitasking ==
The term preemptive multitasking is used to distinguish a multitasking operating system, which permits preemption of tasks, from a cooperative multitasking system wherein processes or tasks must be explicitly programmed to yield when they do not need system resources.

In simple terms: Preemptive multitasking involves the use of an interrupt mechanism which suspends the currently executing process and invokes a scheduler to determine which process should execute next. Therefore, all processes will get some amount of CPU time at any given time.

In preemptive multitasking, the operating system kernel can also initiate a context switch to satisfy the scheduling policy's priority constraint, thus preempting the active task. In general, preemption means "prior seizure of". When the high-priority task at that instance seizes the currently running task, it is known as preemptive scheduling.

The term "preemptive multitasking" is sometimes mistakenly used when the intended meaning is more specific, referring instead to the class of scheduling policies known as time-shared scheduling, or time-sharing.

Preemptive multitasking allows the computer system to more reliably guarantee each process a regular "slice" of operating time. It also allows the system to rapidly deal with important external events like incoming data, which might require the immediate attention of one or another process.

At any specific time, processes can be grouped into two categories: those that are waiting for input or output (called "I/O bound"), and those that are fully utilizing the CPU ("CPU bound"). In early systems, processes would often "poll" or "busy-wait" while waiting for requested input (such as disk, keyboard or network input). During this time, the process was not performing useful work, but still maintained complete control of the CPU. With the advent of interrupts and preemptive multitasking, these I/O bound processes could be "blocked", or put on hold, pending the arrival of the necessary data, allowing other processes to utilize the CPU. As the arrival of the requested data would generate an interrupt, blocked processes could be guaranteed a timely return to execution.

Although multitasking techniques were originally developed to allow multiple users to share a single machine, it became apparent that multitasking was useful regardless of the number of users. Many operating systems, from mainframes down to single-user personal computers and no-user control systems (like those in robotic spacecraft), have recognized the usefulness of multitasking support for a variety of reasons. Multitasking makes it possible for a single user to run multiple applications at the same time, or to run "background" processes while retaining control of the computer.

=== Time slice ===
The period of time for which a process is allowed to run in a preemptive multitasking system is generally called the time slice or quantum. The scheduler is run once every time slice to choose the next process to run. The length of each time slice can be critical to balancing system performance vs process responsiveness - if the time slice is too short then the scheduler itself will consume too much processing time, but if the time slice is too long, processes will take longer to respond to input.

An interrupt is scheduled to allow the operating system kernel to switch between processes when their time slices expire, effectively allowing the processor's time to be shared among a number of tasks, giving the illusion that it is dealing with these tasks in parallel (simultaneously). The operating system which controls such a design is called a multi-tasking system.

=== System support ===
Today, nearly all operating systems support preemptive multitasking, including the current versions of Windows, Linux (including Android), and Darwin (including macOS and iOS).

An early microcomputer operating system providing preemptive multitasking was Microware's OS-9, available for computers based on the Motorola 6809, including home computers such as the TRS-80 Color Computer 2 when configured with disk drives, with the operating system supplied by Tandy as an upgrade. Sinclair QDOS and AmigaOS on the Amiga were also microcomputer operating systems offering preemptive multitasking as a core feature. These both ran on Motorola 68000-family microprocessors without memory management. Amiga OS used dynamic loading of relocatable code blocks ("hunks" in Amiga jargon) to multitask preemptively all processes in the same flat address space.

Early operating systems for IBM PC compatibles such as MS-DOS and PC DOS, did not support multitasking at all, however alternative operating systems such as MP/M-86 (1981) and Concurrent CP/M-86 did support preemptive multitasking. Other Unix-like systems including MINIX and Coherent provided preemptive multitasking on 1980s-era personal computers.

Later MS-DOS compatible systems natively supporting preemptive multitasking/multithreading include Concurrent DOS, Multiuser DOS, Novell DOS (later called Caldera OpenDOS and DR-DOS 7.02 and higher). Since Concurrent DOS 386, they could also run multiple DOS programs concurrently in virtual DOS machines.

The earliest version of Windows to support a limited form of preemptive multitasking was Windows/386 2.0, which used the Intel 80386's Virtual 8086 mode to run DOS applications in virtual 8086 machines, commonly known as "DOS boxes", which could be preempted. In Windows 95, 98 and Me, 32-bit applications were made preemptive by running each one in a separate address space, but 16-bit applications remained cooperative for backward compatibility. In Windows 3.1x (protected mode), the kernel and virtual device drivers ran preemptively, but all 16-bit applications were non-preemptive and shared the same address space.

Preemptive multitasking has always been supported by Windows NT (all versions), OS/2 (native applications), Unix and Unix-like systems (such as Linux, BSD and macOS), VMS, OS/360, and many other operating systems designed for use in the academic and medium-to-large business markets.

Early versions of the classic Mac OS did not support multitasking at all, with cooperative multitasking becoming available via MultiFinder in System Software 5 and then standard in System 7. Although there were plans to upgrade the cooperative multitasking found in the classic Mac OS to a preemptive model (and a preemptive API did exist in Mac OS 9, although in a limited sense), these were abandoned in favor of Mac OS X (now called macOS) that, as a hybrid of the old Mac System style and NeXTSTEP, is an operating system based on the Mach kernel and derived in part from BSD, which had always provided Unix-like preemptive multitasking.

== See also ==
- Computer multitasking
- Cooperative multitasking
