= Uname =

Standard UNIX utility that prints name and other details about the machine

uname
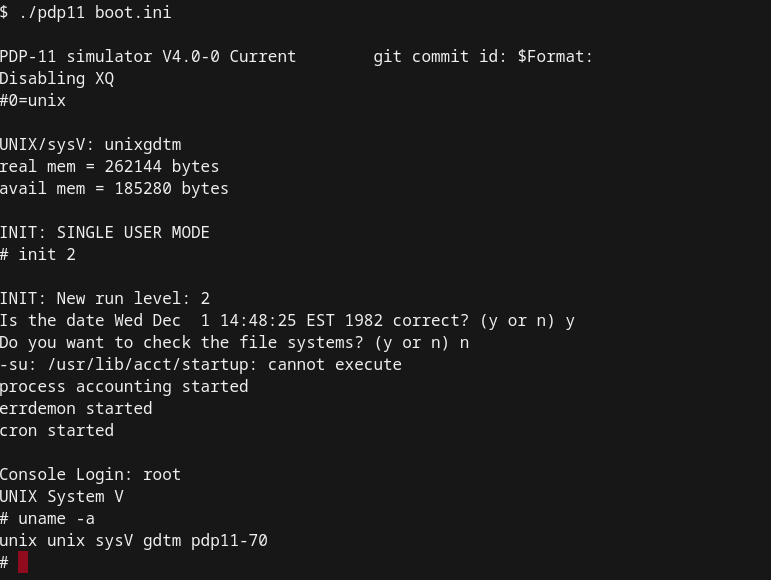
- The uname command on UNIX System V
- Developers: AT&T Bell Laboratories, David MacKenzie.
- Operating system: Unix and Unix-like
- Platform: Cross-platform
- Type: Command
- License: coreutils: GPL-3.0-or-later

uname (short for unix name) is a computer program in Unix and Unix-like computer operating systems that prints the name, version and other details about the current machine and the operating system running on it.

== History ==
The uname system call and command appeared for the first time in PWB/UNIX. Both are specified by POSIX. The GNU version of uname is included in the "sh-utils" or "coreutils" packages. uname itself is not available as a standalone program. The version of uname bundled in GNU coreutils was written by David MacKenzie. The command is available as a separate package for Microsoft Windows as part of the GnuWin32 project and the UnxUtils collection of native Win32 ports of common GNU Unix-like utilities.

== Related and similar commands ==
- Some Unix variants, such as AT&T UNIX System V Release 3.0, include the related setname program, used to change the values that uname reports.
- The ver command in MS-DOS, OS/2, and Windows is similar to uname.
- The bash shell provides the special variables OSTYPE and HOSTTYPE whose values are similar to those of uname -o and uname -m respectively.

== Examples ==
On a system running Darwin, the output from running uname with the -a command-line argument might look like the text below:

$ uname -a
Darwin Roadrunner.local 10.3.0 Darwin Kernel Version 10.3.0: Fri Feb 26 11:58:09 PST 2010; root:xnu-1504.3.12~1/RELEASE_I386 i386

The following table contains examples from various versions of uname on various platforms.

Distribution	System (or kernel) (-s) POSIX	Operating System (or distribution) (-o)	Machine (-m) POSIX	Processor (-p)	Hardware platform (-i or -M)	OS (kernel) version (-v) POSIX	OS (kernel) release (-r) POSIX
Android 4.2.1 on Nexus 4	Linux	GNU/Linux	armv7l	Unknown	Unknown	#1 SMP PREEMPT Thu Nov 8 15:42:02 PST 2012	3.4.0-perf-ge039dcb
Android 2.3 on Meteorit netbook	Linux	GNU/Linux	armv6l	Unknown	Unknown		
any, coreutils 7.1	Linux	GNU/Linux	sparc64	sparc64	UltraSPARC T1 (Niagara)	(all)	(all)
any, coreutils 7.1–8.4	Linux	GNU/Linux	ppc64	ppc64	PPC 970FX (XServe G5)	(all)	(all)
Arch Linux	Linux	GNU/Linux	x86_64	Unknown	Unknown	#1 SMP PREEMPT_DYNAMIC Tue, 04 Oct 2022 19:16:52 +0000	6.0.0-arch1-1
A/UX 3.1	A/UX	illegal option	mc68030	illegal option	illegal option	SVR2	3.1
busybox-w32 1.27 (32-bit) on Windows 10	Windows_NT	MS/Windows	i686	Unknown	Unknown	9200	6.2
busybox-w32 1.27 (64-bit) on Wine 2.0	Windows_NT	MS/Windows	x86_64	Unknown	Unknown	3790	5.2
CentOS 6.5, Pentium SU4100	Linux	GNU/Linux	i686	i686	i386	#1 SMP Fri Nov 22 00:26:36 UTC 2013	2.6.32-431.el6.i686
Cray UNICOS 9.0.2.2	sn5176	illegal option	CRAY Y-MP	illegal option	illegal option	sin.0	9.0.2.2
Cygwin (Windows XP), Pentium 4	CYGWIN_NT-5.1	Cygwin	i686	Unknown	Unknown	2006-01-20 13:28	1.5.19(0.150/4/2)
Cygwin 1.7 (Windows 7 32-bit), Core i7	CYGWIN_NT-6.1	Cygwin	i686	Unknown	Unknown	2012-07-20 22:55	1.7.16(0.262/5/3)
Cygwin 1.7 (Windows 7 64-bit), Core i7	CYGWIN_NT-6.1-WOW64	Cygwin	i686	Unknown	Unknown	2012-05-09 10:25	1.7.15(0.260/5/3)
Cygwin 1.7 64 bit (Windows 7 64-bit)	CYGWIN_NT-6.1	Cygwin	x86_64	Unknown	Unknown	2014-02-09 21:06	1.7.28(0.271/5/3)
Cygwin 2.2 64 bit (Windows 10 64-bit)	CYGWIN_NT-10.0	Cygwin	x86_64	Unknown	Unknown	2015-08-20 11:42	2.2.1(0.289/5/3)
DJGPP v2 32 bit (Windows Server 2008)	MS-DOS	illegal option	i686	illegal option	illegal option	50	5
Debian 6.0.5 on Raspberry Pi B	Linux	GNU/Linux	armv6l	Unknown	-i unknown -M invalid	#90 Wed Apr 18 18:23:05 BST 2012 / #538 PREEMPT Fri Aug 30 20:42:08 BST 2013	3.1.9+ / 3.6.11+
Debian on WD MyBookLive	Linux	GNU/Linux	ppc	Unknown	-i unknown -M invalid	#1 Fri Oct 15 17:13:23 PDT 2010	2.6.32.11-svn21605
Debian GNU/Hurd	GNU	GNU	i686-AT386	Unknown	-i unknown -M illegal option	GNU-Mach 1.3.99-486/Hurd-0.3	0.3
Debian GNU/kFreeBSD 6.0, AMD	GNU/kFreeBSD	GNU/kFreeBSD	x86_64	amd64	AMD Sempron Processor 3000+	#0 Thu Nov 26 04:22:59 CET 2009	8.0-1-amd64
DragonFlyBSD	DragonFly	illegal option	i386	i386	GENERIC	DragonFly v2.13.0.749.g93fef-DEVELOPMENT #0: …	2.13-DEVELOPMENT
DragonFlyBSD 2.7, AMD64	DragonFly	illegal option	x86_64	x86_64	[filename of kernel conf file]	DragonFly v2.7.3.122.g0ba92-DEVELOPMENT #0: Tue June 8 16:50:35 CEST 2010	2.7-DEVELOPMENT root@Chance.: /usr/obj/usr/src/sys/X86_64_GENERIC
Fedora 19	Linux	GNU/Linux	i686	i686	i386	#1 SMP Fri Mar 7 17:22:54 UTC 2014	3.13.6-100.fc19.i686
FreeBSD 6.1, Intel	FreeBSD	illegal option	i386	i386	[kernel name from kernel conf file. i.e.: GENERIC]	FreeBSD 6.1-RELEASE-p15 #1: Sun Apr 15 18:04:51 EDT 2007	6.1-RELEASE-p15
FreeBSD 9.0, Intel	FreeBSD	FreeBSD	amd64	amd64	[kernel name from kernel conf file. i.e.: GENERIC]	FreeBSD 9.0-RELEASE #0: Tue Jan 3 07:46:30 UTC 2012 root@farrell.cse.buffalo.edu:/usr/obj/usr/src/sys/GENERIC	9.0-RELEASE
Gentoo, UltraSparc IIe	Linux	GNU/Linux	sparc64	sun4u	TI UltraSparc IIe (Hummingbird)	#1 SMP Wed Nov 10 02:04:26 CET 2010	2.6.34-gentoo-r12
Haiku R1/Alpha 1, QEMU	Haiku	Haiku	BePC	Unknown	Unknown	r33109 Sep 12 2009 17:45:45	1
HP-UX	HP-UX	illegal option	9000/712	illegal option	[Unique machine ID number or node name if cannot be determined.]	U	B.11.11
HP-UX 11i v3	HP-UX	illegal option	ia64	illegal option	[Unique machine ID number or node name if cannot be determined.]	U	B.11.31
GNU Hurd	GNU	GNU	i686-AT386	Unknown	Unknown	GNU-Mach 1.8+git20190109-486/Hurd-0.9	0.9
IBM AIX PS/2 v1.3	AIX	illegal option	i386	illegal option	illegal option	1	3.0
IBM AIX 5.3	AIX	illegal option	(serial number of machine)	powerpc	IBM,8205-E6B	5	3
IBM AIX 7.1	AIX	illegal option	(serial number of machine)	powerpc	IBM,7891-73X	7	1
IBM AIX 7.2	AIX	illegal option	(serial number of machine)	powerpc	IBM,9009-42A	7	2
IBM i 5.3 with QSH	OS400	(hostname)	(serial number of machine)	Unknown	Unknown	5	3
IBM i 6.1 with QSH	OS400	(hostname)	(serial number of machine)	Unknown	Unknown	6	1
IBM i 7.1 with QSH	OS400	(hostname)	(serial number of machine)	Unknown	Unknown	7	1
Interix (Windows Services for UNIX) 3.5	Interix	illegal option	x86	Intel_x86_Family6_Model28_Stepping10	illegal option	10.0.7063.0	6.1
Interix, Subsystem for Unix-based Applications (SUA), AMD64 6.1 (Windows 2008 R2)	Interix	—	genuineintel	Intel64_Family_6_Model_26_Stepping_4	—	10.0.7063.0	6.1
IRIX	IRIX	illegal option	IP22	mips	illegal option		
IRIX 6.5.30, Origin 2000	IRIX64	illegal option	IP30 IP35	mips	illegal option	07202013	6.5
Linux Mint 10 "Julia" 64-bit	Linux	GNU/Linux	x86_64	Unknown	Unknown	#33-Ubuntu SMP Sun Sep 19 20:32:27 UTC 2010	2.6.35-22-generic
Linux on Xeon Phi	Linux	GNU/Linux	k1om	k1om	k1om	#2 SMP Fri Jun 21 13:43:31 EDT 2013	2.6.38.8-g2593b11
Mac OS X Panther 10.3, PowerBook G4 (2004)	Darwin	illegal option	Power Macintosh	powerpc	illegal option	Darwin Kernel Version 7.8.0: Wed Dec 22 14:26:17 PST 2004; root:xnu/xnu-517.11.1.obj~1/RELEASE_PPC	7.8.0
Mac OS X Snow Leopard 10.6, MacBook3,1 (Late 2007)	Darwin	illegal option	i386	i386	illegal option	Darwin Kernel Version 10.0.0: Fri Jul 31 22:47:34 PDT 2009; root:xnu-1456.1.25~1/RELEASE_I386	10.0.0
Mac OS X Lion 10.7.3 build 11D50, MacbookPro7,1 (Late 2010)	Darwin	illegal option	x86_64	i386	illegal option	Darwin Kernel Version 11.3.0: Thu Jan 12 18:47:41 PST 2012; root:xnu-1699.24.23~1/RELEASE_X86_64	11.3.0
OS X Mountain Lion 10.8.3 build 12D78, MacbookPro10,1 (Mid 2012)	Darwin	illegal option	x86_64	i386	illegal option	Darwin Kernel Version 12.3.0: Sun Jan 6 22:37:10 PST 2013; root:xnu-2050.22.13~1/RELEASE_X86_64	12.3.0
OS X Mavericks 10.9 build 13A598, MacbookPro5,1 (Mid 2009)	Darwin	illegal option	x86_64	i386	illegal option	Darwin Kernel Version 13.0.0: Thu Sep 19 22:22:27 PDT 2013; root:xnu-2422.1.72~6/RELEASE_X86_64	13.0.0
OS X Yosemite 10.10 build 14A298i, MacbookPro6,2 (Mid 2010)	Darwin	illegal option	x86_64	i386	illegal option	Darwin Kernel Version 14.0.0: Tue Jul 15 23:56:31 PDT 2014; root:xnu-2782.1.43.0.2~1/RELEASE_X86_64	14.0.0
OS X El Capitan 10.11 build 15A284, MacBookPro10,1 (Mid 2012)	Darwin	illegal option	x86_64	i386	illegal option	Darwin Kernel Version 15.0.0: Sat Sep 19 15:53:46 PDT 2015; root:xnu-3247.10.11~1/RELEASE_X86_64	15.0.0
macOS Sierra 10.12 build 16E195, MacBookPro12,1 (Early 2015)	Darwin	illegal option	x86_64	i386	illegal option	Darwin Kernel Version 16.5.0: Fri Mar 3 16:52:33 PST 2017; root:xnu-3789.51.2~3/RELEASE_X86_64	16.5.0
macOS High Sierra 10.13.3 build 17D47, MacBookPro12,1 (Early 2015)	Darwin	illegal option	x86_64	i386	illegal option	Darwin Kernel Version 17.4.0: Sun Dec 17 09:19:54 PST 2017; root:xnu-4570.41.2~1/RELEASE_X86_64	17.4.0
macOS Mojave 10.14.3 build 18D109	Darwin	illegal option	x86_64	i386	illegal option	Darwin Kernel Version 18.2.0: Thu Dec 20 20:46:53 PST 2018; root:xnu-4903.241.1~1/RELEASE_X86_64	18.2.0
macOS Catalina 10.15.5 build 19F101	Darwin	Darwin	x86_64	i386	MacBookPro15.1	Darwin Kernel Version 19.5.0: Tue May 26 20:41:44 PDT 2020; root:xnu-6153.121.2~2/RELEASE_X86_64	19.5.0
macOS Big Sur 11.0.1 build 20B29 on Apple M1	Darwin	illegal option	arm64	arm	illegal option	Darwin Kernel Version 20.1.0: Sat Oct 31 00:07:10 PDT 2020; root:xnu-7195.50.7~2/RELEASE_ARM64_T8101	20.1.0
macOS Monterey 12.2.1 build 21D62 on Apple M1	Darwin	illegal option	arm64	arm	illegal option	Darwin Kernel Version 21.3.0: Wed Jan 5 21:37:58 PST 2022; root:xnu-8019.80.24~20/RELEASE_ARM64_T8101	21.3.0
Manjaro Linux 0.8.11 64 bit	Linux	GNU/Linux	x86_64	Unknown	Unknown	#1 SMP PREEMPT Sat Nov 15 10:54:42 UTC 2014	3.17.3-1-MANJARO
Microsoft POSIX subsystem, Windows NT 4.0 (SP6), Pentium	Windows NT	—	Pentium	Unknown	Unknown	5	3
MidnightBSD 1.0, Intel	MidnightBSD	MidnightBSD	amd64	amd64	[kernel name from kernel conf file. i.e.: GENERIC]	MidnightBSD 1.0 #5 r11989M: Sat Aug 11 13:20:45 EDT 2018 root@stargazer.midnightbsd.org:/usr/obj/usr/src/sys/GENERIC	1.0
MINIX 3.1.7, x86	Minix	illegal option	i686	i386	illegal option	1.7	3
MinGW 32 bit (Windows 7)	MINGW32_NT-6.1	Msys	i686	Unknown	Unknown	2018-11-26 09:22	2.11.2(0.329/5/3)
MinGW 64 bit (Windows 7)	MINGW64_NT-6.1	Msys	x86_64	Unknown	Unknown	2018-11-26 09:22	2.11.2(0.329/5/3)
MSYS 32 bit (Windows 7)	MSYS_NT-6.1	Msys	i686	Unknown	Unknown	2018-11-26 09:22	2.11.2(0.329/5/3)
MSYS 64 bit (Windows 7)	MSYS_NT-6.1	Msys	x86_64	Unknown	Unknown	2018-11-26 09:22	2.11.2(0.329/5/3)
NetBSD	NetBSD	Unknown	i386	i386	Unknown	NetBSD 6.0.1 (GENERIC)	6.0.1
NonStop OS H06 25	NONSTOP_KERNEL	Unknown	NSE-T	Unknown	H06	25	Unknown
NonStop OS J06 14	NONSTOP_KERNEL	Unknown	NSE-AB	Unknown	J06	14	Unknown
OpenBSD 5.4	OpenBSD	illegal option	amd64	amd64	illegal option	GENERIC.MP#1	5.4
openSUSE 10.3, Core2-duo 64-bit	Linux	GNU/Linux	x86_64	x86_64	x86_64	#1 SMP 2007/09/21 22:29:00 UTC	2.6.22.5-31-default
openSUSE Tumbleweed	Linux	GNU/Linux	x86_64	x86_64	x86_64	#1 SMP PREEMPT_DYNAMIC Mon Feb 17 10:42:46 UTC 2025 (36519ec)	6.13.3-1-default
OpenWRT Barrier Breaker r40420 on TL-WR1043ND	Linux	GNU/Linux	mips	Unknown	-i unknown -M invalid	#1 Tue Apr 8 06:30:07 UTC 2014	3.10.34
QNX	QNX	—	x86pc	x86	—	2010/07/09-14:44:03EDT	6.5.0
Red Hat Linux, Fedora Core 6, AMD Turion64 mobile	Linux	GNU/Linux	i686	athlon	i386	#1 SMP Wed Jan 10 19:28:18 EST 2007	2.6.19-1.2895.fc6
ReliantUNIX	ReliantUNIX-Y		RM600	R4000		B2005	5.45
SINIX	SINIX-Y		RM600	R4000			5.43
Solaris 2.5.1 Intel Platform Edition	SunOS	Solaris	i86pc	i386	i86pc	Generic_103641-42	5.5.1
Solaris 8	SunOS	illegal option	sun4u	sparc	SUNW, UltraAX-i2	Generic_117350-50	5.8
Solaris 9, Sun Fire 280R	SunOS	illegal option	sun4u	sparc	SUNW, Sun-Fire-280R	Generic_112233-08	5.9
Solaris 10, Sun Fire V490	SunOS	illegal option	sun4u	sparc	SUNW, Sun-Fire-V490	Generic_142900-13	5.10
Solaris 11 Express (201011), x86 (Note: The default desktop installation of this operating system has /usr/gnu/bin come before /usr/bin in PATH, so the GNU implementation of uname command is used by default, which supports -o option.)	SunOS	Solaris	i86pc	i386	i86pc	snv_151a	5.11
Solaris 11.1, Sun Fire X4540	SunOS	illegal option	i86pc	i386	i86pc	11.1	5.11
OpenIndiana	SunOS	illegal option	i86pc	i386	i86pc	oi_151a8	5.11
OpenIndiana Hipster 2018.04	SunOS	Solaris	i86pc	i386	i86pc	illumos-47b8d4b884	5.11
OpenIndiana Hipster 2021.10	SunOS	illumos	i86pc	i386	i86pc	illumos-b12aaafbf5	5.11
SmartOS	SunOS	illumos	i86pc	i386	i86pc	joyent_20250206T001102Z	5.11
OmniOS	SunOS	illegal option	i86pc	i386	i86pc	omnios-a708424	5.11
Tru64	OSF1	invalid	alpha	alpha	invalid	2650	V5.1
Ubuntu 11.04	Linux	GNU/Linux	x86_64	x86_64	x86_64	#46-Ubuntu SMP Tue Jun 28 15:07:17 UTC 2011	2.6.38-10-generic
Ubuntu 12.0.4 on Pandaboard ES	Linux	GNU/Linux	armv7l	armv7l	armv7l	#33-Ubuntu SMP PREEMPT Sat Jan 26 00:46:04 UTC 2013	3.2.0-1425-omap4
Ubuntu 20.0.4LTS on Raspberry Pi 4 Model B	Linux	GNU/Linux	aarch64	aarch64	aarch64	#20-Ubuntu SMP Sun Sep 6 05:11:16 UTC 2020	5.4.0-1018-raspi
Ultrix	ULTRIX	—	VAX	—	—	0	4.5
UnxUtils 2007 32 bit (Windows Server 2008)	WindowsNT	illegal option	x86	illegal option	illegal option	6	0
(SCO) OpenServer 5.0.6	SCO_SV	(hostname)	i386	i386	illegal	5.0.6	3.2
(SCO) System V	SCO_SV	illegal	i386	i386	illegal	6.0.0	5
(SCO) UnixWare 7.1.4	UnixWare	illegal option	i386	x86at	-i hardware serial/license number, .e.g. 1AB000123 or NUL000000 -M illegal option	7.1.4	5
UWIN (64 bit Windows 7), Intel Core i5	UWIN-W7	UWIN	i686-64	x64	64/64	2012-06-26	5.0/6.1
SYS$UNIX:SH on OpenVMS on VAX emulator	IS/WB	illegal option	vax-6340	illegal option	illegal option	std	5.0
z/OS USS	OS/390	Unknown	2097	Unknown	-i -M unknown option -I z/OS	03	22.00
Windows Subsystem for Linux (WSL), Ubuntu 18.04	Linux	GNU/Linux	x86_64	x86_64	x86_64	#476-Microsoft Fri Nov 01 16:53:00 PST 2019	4.4.0-18362-Microsoft
Windows Subsystem for Linux (WSL2), Ubuntu 20.04	Linux	GNU/Linux	x86_64	x86_64	x86_64	#1 SMP Wed Aug 25 23:20:18 UTC 2021	5.10.60.1-microsoft-standard-WSL2

== See also ==
- List of Unix commands
- lsb_release
- ver (command)
