= Environment subsystem =

Components of Windows NT providing compatibility with applications

Windows NT operating systems often support applications written or compiled for platforms other than Windows. In Windows 2000, applications compiled for OS/2 1.x run natively atop the NT kernel, but POSIX applications must be recompiled and linked against the relevant POSIX libraries. Some environment subsystems permit interprocess communication with applications in other subsystems.

In the Windows NT architecture, environment subsystems (sometimes referred to as personalities) are user space components of the operating system that provide compatibility with an application binary interface. They allow the operating system to run software developed for the platform in question. For example, Windows NT 4.0 has three environment subsystems: Win32 (Windows API), OS/2, and POSIX, the latter of which corresponding a subset of the most common functions in the application programming interfaces of Unix-like systems. The latter resides primarily in the dynamic-link library posix.dll. The environment subsystems are one part of the strategy Microsoft developed for making the Windows NT family of operating systems a hub for multi-platform computing in addition to other elements of the architecture of Windows NT like the hardware abstraction layer.

An environment subsystem is a mechanism in the Windows NT operating-system architecture that offers an application programming interface (API) for applications to communicate with services in the OS. Windows NT was intended to support several different application environments (Win32, POSIX and OS/2), compatible software written for various environments is able to run on the same operating-system kernel. There were many different subsystems available depending on the Windows NT version, the original OS/2 and POSIX subsystems were phased out or replaced by other means of compatibility.

== See also ==
- Architecture of Windows NT
- Interix
- Microsoft POSIX subsystem
- Microsoft Windows library files
- NTVDM
- Windows 11#Windows Subsystem for Android
- Windows Subsystem for Linux
- WoW64
