= Mintty =

Open source terminal emulator

mintty

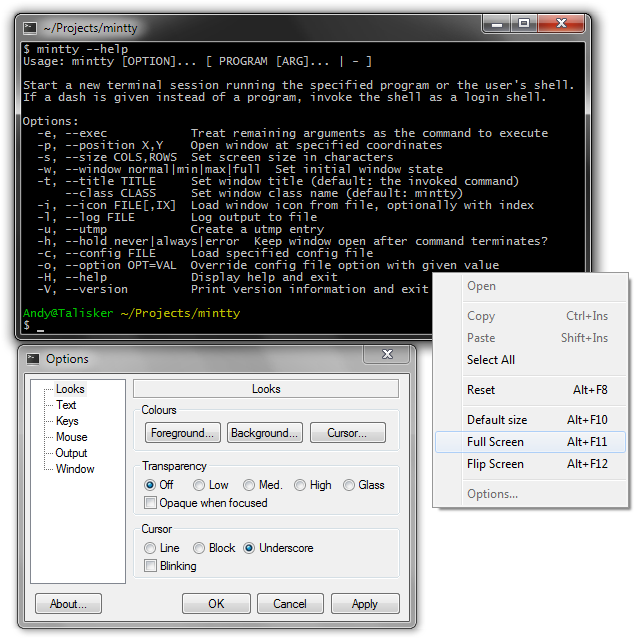
- Developers: Andy Koppe; Thomas Wolff
- Release: 2008; 18 years ago
- Stable release: 3.8.3 / 8 June 2026; 2 months ago
- Written in: C
- Operating system: Windows
- Platform: Cygwin
- Type: Terminal emulator
- License: GPL-3.0-or-later
- Website: mintty.github.io
- Repository: github.com/mintty/mintty

mintty is a free and open source terminal emulator for Cygwin, the Unix-like environment for Windows. It features a native Windows user interface and does not require a display server; its terminal emulation is aimed to be compatible with xterm.

Mintty is based on the terminal emulation and Windows frontend parts of PuTTY, but improves on them in a number of ways, particularly regarding xterm compatibility. It is written in C. The POSIX API provided by Cygwin is used to communicate with processes running within mintty, while its user interface is implemented using the Windows API. The program icon comes from KDE's Konsole.

Towards the end of 2011, mintty became Cygwin's default terminal. Advantages over Cygwin's previous default console include a more flexible user interface and closer adherence to Unix standards and conventions. Since it is not based on the standard Windows console, however, programs written specifically for that do not work correctly in mintty. It is also available for MSYS (a more minimal Unix environment forked from Cygwin).

Originally, the project's name was styled "MinTTY", following the example of PuTTY, but it was later restyled to "mintty", which was felt to better suit the project's minimalist approach.
