= Mingw-w64 =

Free, open-source, CLI tools for creating Windows-native binaries

MinGW-w64
- Original author: OneVision Software
- Developers: Kai Tietz, Jonathan Yong, various GNU contributors
- Release: 2005; 21 years ago
- Stable release: 13.0.0 / June 4, 2025; 17 months ago
- Written in: C, C++
- Operating system: Microsoft Windows, Linux, macOS
- Type: Compiler
- License: Public domain (headers), GNU General Public License (compiler and toolchain), Zope Public License
- Website: mingw-w64.org
- Repository: sf.net/p/mingw-w64/mingw-w64/

Mingw-w64 is a free and open-source suite of development tools that generate Portable Executable (PE) binaries for Microsoft Windows. It was forked in 2005–2010 from MinGW (Minimalist GNU for Windows).

Mingw-w64 includes a build of the GNU Compiler Collection (GCC) targeting the MinGW-w64 platform, GNU Binutils for Windows (assembler, linker, archive manager), a set of freely distributable Windows specific header files and static import libraries for the Windows API, a Windows-native version of the GNU Project's GNU Debugger, and miscellaneous utilities.

Mingw-w64 can be run natively on Microsoft Windows, cross-hosted on Linux (or other Unix), or "cross-native" on MSYS2 or Cygwin. Mingw-w64 can generate 32-bit and 64-bit executables for x86 under the target names i686-w64-mingw32 and x86_64-w64-mingw32.

== History ==
In 2005, after the original MinGW project was not prompt on updating its code base to include key new APIs and 64-bit support, OneVision Software began reverse-engineering the 64-bit Windows API by clean-room design. In 2008, OneVision donated the code to Kai Tietz, one of its lead developers, under the condition that it remain open source. It was first submitted to the original MinGW project, but refused under suspicion of using non-public or proprietary information. Tietz would later decide not to attempt further cooperation with MinGW.

MinGW-w64 provides a more complete Win32 API implementation, including:

- Better C99 support
- POSIX Threads (pthreads) support (including the possibility of enabling C++11 thread-related functionality in GCC's libstdc++)
- GCC multilib, which allows users to install 32-bit and 64-bit libraries in parallel
- Unicode entry point (wmain/wWinMain)
- DDK (from ReactOS)
- DirectX (from Wine)
- Large file support
- Win64 support
- Structured Exception Handling (SEH) instead of DWARF or sjlj on x86-64 (from gcc 4.8+)
- Some useful tools such as gendef (an improved version of MinGW's pexports utility), and widl (an MIDL compiler from Wine).

Additionally, the Mingw-w64 project maintains winpthreads, a wrapper library similar to pthreads-win32, with the main difference that it allows GCC to use it as a threads library resulting in functional C++11 thread libraries <thread>, <future>, and <mutex>.

== MSYS2 ==
MSYS2 ("minimal system 2") is a software distribution and a development platform for Microsoft Windows, based on Mingw-w64 and Cygwin, that helps to deploy code from the Unix world on Windows. It plays the same role the old MSYS did in MinGW.

MSYS2 shares this goal of bringing Unix code to Windows machines with several other projects, most notably Cygwin and Windows Subsystem for Linux (WSL). WSL lets Linux ELF binaries run on Windows through a managed virtual machine. Cygwin provides a full POSIX environment (as a windows DLL) in which applications, compiled as Windows EXEs, run as they would under Unix.

Instead of providing a full environment like Cygwin does, MSYS2 tasks itself with being a development and deployment platform.

- There is a main MSYS2 environment (similar to, and in fact derived from, Cygwin's emulation code) with package manager and standard Unix system tool. This way, when managing MSYS2 itself, standard Unix tools can be used unmodified by using the emulated environment. It's also possible to install build tools in the MSYS2 emulated environment in case the user wants to build software that depends on the POSIX emulation layer instead of the native API.
- In addition, four environments are provided containing native compilers, build tools and libraries that can be directly used to build native Windows 32-bit or 64-bit programs. The final programs built with the two native environments don't use any kind of emulation and can run or be distributed like native Windows programs. The environments are MINGW64 and MINGW32 (the original MinGW-w64 environments using gcc, msvcrt, and libstdc++), UCRT64 (adaptation of MINGW64 to ucrt), and CLANG64 (adaptation of UCRT64 to clang and libc++). While Cygwin also provides MinGW-w64 compilers and libraries, the set of available libraries is smaller, and they are not as easily managed due to not being placed in separate prefixes.

The main MSYS2 environment provides a package manager (Pacman from Arch Linux), a bash shell, and other Unix programs. It uses a runtime library msys-2.0.dll (~20MB) that is derived from the Cygwin library cygwin1.dll, and is updated regularly to keep track of the Cygwin development. It is intended as a development environment, one that developers can manage (using pacman) and run their tools with. Features judged unnecessary for development are removed.

As with Cygwin, MSYS2 supports path translation for non-MSYS2 software launched from it. For example one can use the command notepad++ /c/Users/John/file.txt to launch an editor that will open the file with the Windows path C:\Users\John\file.txt.

MSYS2 and its bash environment is used by Git and GNU Octave for their official Windows distribution.

== Compiler ==
Most languages supported by GCC are supported on the Mingw-w64 port as well. These include C, C++, Objective-C, Objective-C++, Fortran, and Ada. The GCC runtime libraries are used (libstdc++ for C++, libgfortran for Fortran, etc.). A packaging of LLVM's clang to mingw-w64 is also provided by MSYS2. It supports ARM for Windows (aarch64-w64-mingw32 and armv7-w64-mingw32).

Binaries (executables or DLLs) generated with different C++ compilers (like Mingw-w64 GCC and Visual Studio) are in general not link compatible due to the use of different ABIs and name mangling schemes caused by the differences in C++ runtimes. However, compiled C code is link compatible. Clang is an exception, as it mostly supports MSVC's C++ ABI on Windows.

The binutils documentation has up-to-date information about its handling of various Windows-specific formats and special tools for doing so.
