= Windows Services for UNIX =

Discontinued software produced by Microsoft which provided Unix environment on Windows NT

- Other names: SFU, SUA
- Original authors: MKS Inc. (SFU 1.0 / 2.0), Softway Systems, Inc. (SFU 3.0 / 3.5)
- Developer: Microsoft
- Release: February 1999; 27 years ago
- Final release: 3.5 / January 2004; 22 years ago
- Operating system: Microsoft Windows
- Platform: IA-32 and x86-64
- Predecessor: Microsoft POSIX subsystem
- Successor: Windows Subsystem for Linux
- Type: Compatibility layer
- Website: Windows Services for Unix at the Wayback Machine (archived 2017-08-26)

Windows Services for UNIX (SFU) is a discontinued software package produced by Microsoft which provided a Unix environment on Windows NT and some of its immediate successor operating systems.

SFU 1.0 and 2.0 used the MKS Toolkit; starting with SFU 3.0, SFU included the Interix subsystem, which was acquired by Microsoft in 1999 from US-based Softway Systems as part of an asset acquisition. SFU 3.5 was the last release and was available as a free download from Microsoft. Windows Server 2003 R2 included most of the former SFU components (on Disk 2), naming the Interix subsystem component Subsystem for UNIX-based Applications (SUA). In Windows Server 2008 and high-end versions of both Windows Vista and Windows 7 (Enterprise and Ultimate), a minimal Interix SUA was included, but most of the other SFU utilities had to be downloaded separately from Microsoft's web site.

The Interix subsystem included in SFU 3.0 and 3.5 and later released as SUA Windows components provided header files and libraries that made it easier to recompile or port Unix applications for use on Windows; they did not make Linux or other Unix binaries (BSD, Solaris, Xenix etc) compatible with Windows binaries. Like the Microsoft POSIX subsystem that Interix replaced, it is best thought of as a distinct Unix-like platform.

It is replaced by Windows Subsystem for Linux in Windows 10 and Windows Server 2019.

== Components ==
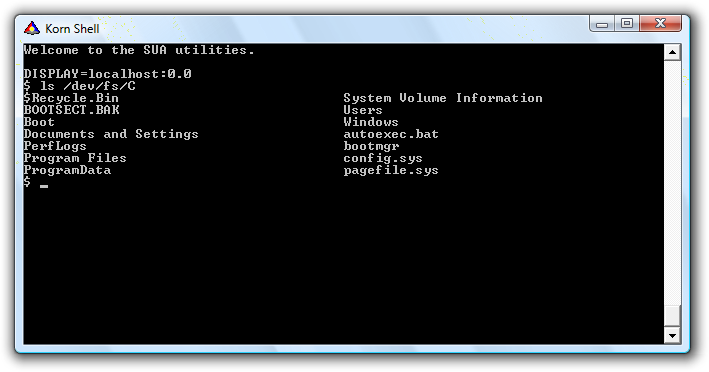
KornShell running on SUA

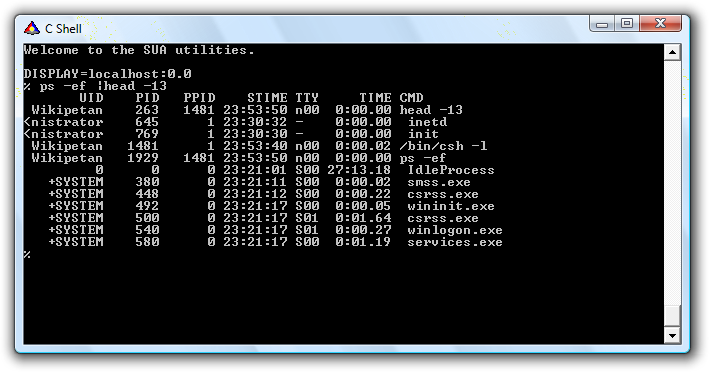
C shell running on SUA

As of SFU 3.5, it contained:

- Over 350 Unix utilities such as vi, ksh, csh, ls, cat, awk, grep, kill, etc.
- GCC 3.3 compiler, includes and libraries (through an MS libc)
- A cc-like wrapper for Microsoft Visual Studio command-line C/C++ compiler
- GDB debugger
- Perl
- NFS server and client
- A pcnfsd daemon
- X11 tools and libraries
- Tools for making NFS mount-points appear as Windows shares, and vice versa (gateway services)
- A NIS server capability linked with Active Directory (AD)
- Some Windows/Unix authentication information-synchronization tools

Although SFU includes X Window System client libraries and applications, it does not contain a native X server. Administrators may configure any of the numerous third-party Windows X servers. Fully featured free options include Cygwin/X, Xming and WeirdX.

== Releases ==
=== 1.0 ===
Microsoft produced at least one beta release of the initial version of SFU before its final release in February 1999. This release, in English only, was supported on the Windows NT 4.0 SP3+ for x86 and Alpha platforms. This is the only known release to support Alpha. It included a demonstration version of the MKS Toolkit along with the following components:

- Telnet server
- Telnet client
- UNIX Utilities (from MKS)
- Client for NFS
- Server for NFS
- Server for NFS Authentication
- Windows NT to UNIX password-synchronization
- Help files and documentation

=== 2.0 ===
This second installment of SFU was released April 2000 and was also for English; however, a Japanese-language release appeared just two months later in June 2000. Both ran on Windows NT 4.0 SP4+ and Windows 2000 on x86 platforms with Internet Explorer 4.01+. SFU 2.0 supported the following UNIX versions: Solaris 2.6+, HP-UX 10.2+, AIX 4.2+, Tru64 UNIX 5.0+, and Red Hat Linux 5.1+. It included the following components:

- Server for NFS (NFSServer)
- Client for NFS (NFSClient)
- Gateway for NFS (NFSGateway)
- Server for PCNFS (Pcnfsd)
- User Name Mapping (Mapsvc)
- Server for NFS Authentication (NFSServerAuth)
- Server for NIS (NIS)
- Telnet Client (TelnetClient)
- Telnet server (TelnetServer)
- Password synchronization (PasswdSync)
- ActiveState ActivePerl (Perl)
- UNIX utilities (UnixUtilities)
- Cron service (CronSvc)
- Rsh service (RshSvc)

There were subsequent updated OEM releases SFU 2.1, SFU 2.2, and SFU 2.3.

=== 3.0 ===
This version, released in May 2002, was the first release to include the Interix subsystem. Previously Microsoft had released Interix 2.2 (actually version 2.2.5) as a separate product around the same time frame as SFU 2.0. This SFU release included Interix release 3.0 (commonly called the "version" as reported by uname -r) with an internal Microsoft version of 7.0 that relates to internal build sequences. This Interix release contained significant technical extensions from the Interix 2.2 release such as a rooted file system and setuid functionality that were entirely based on the Softway Systems' Interix development codenamed "Firebrand". This was also released in English and followed by a later release in Japanese in October 2002, adding internationalization support. Both supported Windows NT 4.0 SP6a+, Windows 2000, and Windows XP Professional on x86 platforms with Internet Explorer 5.0+. The MKS Toolkit was no longer included. It included the following components:

- Base Utilities for Interix (BaseUtils; including X11R5 utilities)
- UNIX Perl for Interix (UNIXPerl)
- Interix SDK (InterixSDK; including headers and libraries for development and a wrapper for Visual Studio compiler)
- GNU Utilities for Interix (GNUUtils, about 9 utilities in total)
- GNU SDK for Interix (GNUSDK; including gcc and g++)
- NFS Client for Windows (NFSClient)
- NFS Gateway for Windows (NFSGateway)
- NFS Server for Windows (NFSServer)
- NIS Server for Windows (NIS)
- Password Synchronization (PasswdSync)
- Windows Remote Shell Service (RshSvc)
- Telnet Server for Windows (TelnetServer)
- NFS User Name Mapping (Mapsvc)
- NFS Authentication Server (NFSServerAuth)
- PCNFS Server (Pcnfsd)
- ActiveState Perl (Perl)

=== 3.5 ===
This was the final release of SFU and the only release to be distributed free of charge. It was released January 2004 and included both English and Japanese versions for Windows 2000, Windows XP Professional, and Windows Server 2003 (original release only (Note: Only works on "R1", not on R2)) on x86 platforms with Internet Explorer 5.0+. It included Interix subsystem release 3.5 (build version 8.0) adding internationalization support (at least for the English version which did not have such until now) and POSIX threading. This release could only be installed to an NTFS file system (earlier versions supported FAT; this was for improved file-security requirements in Interix 3.5). The following UNIX versions were supported for NFS components: Solaris 7 and 8, Red Hat Linux 8.0, AIX 5L 5.2, and HP-UX 11i. It included the following components:

- Base Utilities for Interix (BaseUtils; including X11R6 and X11R5 utilities)
- UNIX Perl for Interix (UNIXPerl)
- Interix SDK (InterixSDK; including headers and libraries for development and a wrapper for Visual Studio compiler)
- GNU Utilities for Interix (GNUUtils, again about 9 utilities)
- GNU SDK for Interix (GNUSDK; including gcc and g++)
- NFS Client for Windows (NFSClient)
- NFS Gateway for Windows (NFSGateway)
- NFS Server for Windows (NFSServer)
- NIS Server for Windows (NIS)
- Password synchronization (PasswdSync)
- Windows Remote Shell Service (RshSvc)
- Telnet Server for Windows (TelnetServer)
- NFS User Name Mapping (Mapsvc)
- NFS Authentication Server (NFSServerAuth)
- PCNFS server (Pcnfsd)
- ActiveState Perl (Perl)

Microsoft does not intend to produce any further standalone versions of SFU, opting instead for the integrated SUA. As of August 18, 2016, v3.5 is unavailable from the provided Microsoft Link. General support continued until 2011; extended support until 2014.

== Known problems ==
Character translation must be used to accommodate filenames which include a colon (:) or other characters that do not comply with the naming conventions of Windows file-systems. Files with the same name but different cases are also not allowed by default, but can be enabled on installation with the side-effect of making the underlying partition's filesystem case-sensitive, even for the Win32 subsystem.

Network authentication for UNIX systems relies on the insecure NIS protocol (LDAP- and Kerberos-based authentication require a third-party solution). Microsoft has released several hotfixes for Windows Services for UNIX, and at least one Security Update (KB939778). The GNU Project utilities are several versions older than the latest ones. A separate port of the up-to-date Debian utilities was started in 2007, but apparently abandoned in 2009. Several of the text processing utilities in SUA (e.g. awk) are not compatible with Unicode or wide character text files.

No version of Windows Services for UNIX is available for Windows XP Professional x64 Edition.

== Legacy ==
Windows Server 2003 R2 contains most SFU components, namely Microsoft Services for Network File System (NFS), Subsystem for UNIX-based Applications (SUA, a.k.a. Interix), and Identity Management for UNIX. The July 2007 SFU 3.5 Security Update updated posix.exe and related files to match the SUA version.

Unlike the SFU, the SUA version included in Windows Server 2003 R2 (and subsequent versions) has 64-bit support and allows linking of Win32 libraries to SUA applications.

Windows Vista and Windows 7 Enterprise and Ultimate Editions also contain the Services for Unix components, now called the Subsystem for UNIX-based applications (SUA), and Client for NFS v3. Users must download the utilities and SDK separately. However, the server components from the SFU product line (namely Server for NFS, User Name Mapping, Server for NIS, Password Synchronization etc.) are not included – these are included in Server editions of Windows (i.e. Windows Server 2008).

SUA was deprecated in Windows 8 Enterprise and Windows Server 2012, and completely removed in Windows 8.1 and Windows Server 2012 R2. The NFS server is still supported in Windows Server 2012 R2.

The NFS client feature and server features are separate from the SUA in Windows 7 and 2008, and remained supported until Windows Subsystem for Linux replaced it. On desktop (Windows 7), NFS is only available in the Enterprise and Ultimate editions. The free reference implementation of NFS 4.1 for Windows (by UMICH CITI), the development of which was sponsored by Microsoft, does work on lower-end versions of Windows 7, but requires more involved installation.

In Windows 8, the NFS client gained krb5p (Kerberos 5 with full data encryption) support. In Windows 7, Kerberos 5 was supported for authentication, but only packet integrity checking was available for data. The maximum block/buffer size was also increased from 32 KB to 1 MB in Windows 8.

Windows Server 2012 added support for NFS 4.1 server. The new implementation is kernel-based (RPC/XDR-wise) but many optional features from NFS4 are not implemented, including ACLs, pNFS etc. There is however support in PowerShell for mapping user identities.

== See also ==
- Cygwin
- UnxUtils
- UWIN
- Windows Subsystem for Linux
