= Inspur K-UX =

- Developer: Inspur
- OS family: Linux (Unix-like)
- Latest release: 3.0
- Supported platforms: IA-64, x86-64
- Kernel type: Monolithic (Linux)
- Userland: GNU, POSIX

Inspur K-UX is a Linux distribution based on Red Hat Enterprise Linux produced by Inspur, a Chinese multinational company specializing in information technology. Inspur K-UX 2.0 and 3.0 for x86-64 were officially certified as UNIX systems by The Open Group.

== Overview ==
Inspur K-UX 1.0 was certified for the Linux Standard Base (LSB 4.0) in 2012. K-UX 1.0 was compiled for the IA-64 architecture (Itanium).

Inspur K-UX 2.0 was one of six commercial operating systems that have versions certified to The Open Group UNIX 03 standard (the others being macOS, Solaris, IBM AIX, HP-UX, and EulerOS). The operating system was certified running on the Inspur Tiansuo K1. The operating system was compiled for the x86-64 architecture. The UNIX 03 conformance statement for Inspur K-UX 2.0 shows that the standard C compiler is from the GNU Compiler Collection (gcc), and the system is a Linux distribution in the Red Hat family tree.

Inspur K-UX 2.2 is featured in SPEC benchmark results, running on the Inspur K1 800 server. The benchmark results describe an Intel Xeon-based server running Inspur K-UX Server 2.2. The operating system appears to be based on Red Hat Enterprise Linux 6 for the x86-64 architecture.

Inspur K-UX 3.0 was also certified as a UNIX OS, although, according to the same website, its certification expired on 3 February 2019 and has not been renewed.
