= State Threads =

- Developer(s): Gene Shekhtman, Mike Abbott
- Stable release: 1.9 / October 2, 2009; 15 years ago
- Written in: C
- Operating system: Cross-platform
- Type: Library
- License: MPL / GPL
- Website: state-threads.sf.net

The State Threads library is a small application library which provides a foundation for writing fast and highly scalable Internet applications (such as web servers, proxy servers, mail transfer agents, or any network-data-driven application) on Unix-like platforms.

This library combines the simplicity of the multithreaded programming paradigm, in which one thread supports each simultaneous connection, with the performance and scalability of an event-driven state machine architecture. In other words, this library offers a threading API for structuring an Internet application as a state machine.

The State Threads library is a derivative of the Netscape Portable Runtime library (NSPR) and therefore is distributed under the Mozilla Public License (MPL) version 1.1 or the GNU General Public License (GPL) version 2 or later.
