= MKS Toolkit =

Software package

MKS Toolkit is a software package produced and maintained by PTC that provides a Unix-like environment for scripting, connectivity and porting Unix and Linux software to Microsoft Windows. It was originally created for MS-DOS, and OS/2 versions were released up to version 4.4. Several editions of each version, such as MKS Toolkit for developers, power users, enterprise developers and interoperability are available, with the enterprise developer edition being the most complete.

Before PTC, MKS Toolkit was owned by MKS Inc. In 1999, MKS acquired a company based in Fairfax, Virginia, USA called Datafocus Inc. The Datafocus product NuTCRACKER had included the MKS Toolkit since 1994 as part of its Unix compatibility technology. The MKS Toolkit was also licensed by Microsoft for the first two versions of their Windows Services for Unix, but later dropped in favor of Interix after Microsoft purchased the latter company.

Version 10.0 was current as of October 2017.

== Overview ==
The MKS Toolkit products offer functionality in the following areas:

- Command shell environments of Bourne shell, KornShell, Bash, C shell, Tcl shell
- Traditional Unix commands (400+), including grep, awk, sed, vi, ls, kill
- Windows specific commands (70+), including registry, shortcut, desktop, wcopy, db, dde, userinfo
- Tape and archive commands, including tar, cpio, pax, zip, bzip2, ar
- Remote connectivity, including ssh, remote shell, telnet, xterm, kterm, rexec, rlogin
- Porting APIs, including fork(), signals, alarms, threads
- Graphical porting APIs, including X, ncurses, Motif, OpenGL

== Supported operating systems ==
MKS Toolkit products support all IA-32 and x64 of the Microsoft Windows operating systems. There is some loss of functionality running IA-32 versions on Windows 9x. Earlier versions ran on MS-DOS and compatible operating systems.

== See also ==
- Cygwin
- MinGW
- Hamilton C shell
- UnxUtils
- UWIN
- GnuWin32
