= MKS Inc. =

Canadian software company

- Formerly: Mortice Kern Systems
- Type: Subsidiary
- Industry: Computer software
- Founded: 1984; 42 years ago
- Fate: Acquired by PTC, Inc.
- Products: Integrity software
- Parent: PTC Inc.

MKS Inc. (formerly called Mortice Kern Systems) is a subsidiary of PTC, Inc. It was previously a multinational independent software vendor that was acquired by Parametric Technology Corporation (now PTC) on May 31, 2011. MKS operated in the Application Lifecycle Management (ALM) and Systems Administration market segments.

Integrity, a PTC Product manages systems and software development processes and connects engineering artifacts, including requirements, models, code and test, ensuring comprehensive lifecycle traceability.

PTC's Integrity Business Unit supports customers across these four core industries: Automotive, Aerospace & Defense, High Tech Electronics and Medical Devices.

== History ==
=== The early years 1984–2000: inception, interoperability and going public ===
Previously named Mortice Kern Systems, MKS was founded in 1984 by four University of Waterloo students, Randall Howard, Alex White, Trevor Thompson and Steve Izma. The company, founded initially as a consulting group, delivered to market its first product, MKS Toolkit, in 1985.

In 1987, MKS stepped into the version control market with a product called MKS RCS, which was renamed to MKS Source Integrity in 1992, deciding at that time to put strategic emphasis and focus expansion on the software configuration management marketplace, a segment of what is now known as Application Lifecycle Management (ALM).

In 1997 MKS began development of an enterprise version management system that formed the underlying architecture of the MKS Integrity ALM product offered today. This initiative was further realized in 1999 when MKS invested the bulk of its R&D efforts towards re-designing MKS Source Integrity as a multi-tier Java EE platform to address the needs of large enterprise installations.

In 1998 MKS purchased the Implementer product and division of Silvon Software, based out of Westmont, Illinois, to add AS/400 support to its ALM product line. Continuing with acquisitions, in 1999 the Interoperability Business Unit merged with DataFocus Inc., a long time OEM partner, and was charged with the evolution of the MKS Toolkit and NuTCRACKER products.

In the 1999–2000 timeframe, the company also embarked on a web content management strategy with the launch of a product called Web Integrity. This precipitated a spin-off strategy, resulting in the formation of a company called Vertical Sky. This short-lived venture was not successful, and the company abandoned its content management product and regrouped and rebuilt under the MKS brand name in 2001.

=== 2001–2008: The rise of application lifecycle management ===
In 2001, following the company's restructuring and refinancing, MKS shifted its primary focus to the enterprise market, expanding from its desktop-based version control and defect tracking system to the multi-tier software change and configuration management (SCM) system it had been developing technically since 1997. The new product, now known as MKS Integrity, had a Java EE foundation and was brought to market in June, 2001. Since that time, the company has expanded feature sets beyond SCM, into what is now called in the marketplace, Application Lifecycle Management (ALM), with the incorporation of requirements management and release management in 2005, and test management and portfolio management in 2006. As of 2006, the ALM revenues for the company constitute over 80% of the annual revenues.

In late 2005 MKS opened an office in Japan where the company began to offer local service and support for their customer base in countries such as Australia, China, Japan, Korea and Singapore.

By October 2006, the Interoperability Division of MKS announced the release of MKS X/Server - technology, SCO XVision Eclipse and the SCO Wintif, that was rebranded after being acquired from SCO.

In 2001 Philip C. Deck, join the company and was appointed CEO. Shortly after, Michael W. Harris, joined and was appointed President and COO in July 2002, and Douglas Sawatzky, formerly VP Finance, as Chief Financial Officer in February, 2006.

In late 2007 and early 2008, the company acted in the embedded systems market and focused its strategy in terms of sales and development on large global organizations in the automotive, aerospace/defense, medical device, and mobile device sectors.

=== 2009–2010: Consolidation of development markets ===
With its industry focus, the company saw advanced product development organizations. These organizations combined software and hardware. These organizations also consolidated traditional product development and software development life cycles.

In late 2009 Michael W. Harris was appointed as the company's President and CEO while Philip C. Deck was appointed Executive Chairman and continues his role as Chairman of the Board of Directors.

August 23, 2010 Charlie Janes returns to MKS and is appointed Vice President of Sales for North America.

In September, 2010, Andrew M. Wertkin was appointed Chief Technology Officer (CTO).

November 3, 2010, Michelle Dickey joined MKS as Vice President Federal Sales to spearhead a team for the North American Government market.

=== 2011: The Acquisition of MKS Inc. ===
On May 31, 2011, it was announced that PTC had completed the acquisition of MKS and that MKS would operate as the Integrity Business Unit of PTC going forward.

=== 2016: PTC Announces closure of former MKS office in Waterloo. ===
By mid 2017 all development staff working on former MKS products were laid off; only a tiny support staff was left to support the (now legacy) Integrity software.

== Timeline ==
- 1984: Founded
- 1985: First release of MKS Toolkit
- 1987: First release of MKS RCS
- 1992: MKS RCS renamed MKS Source Integrity
- 1997: MKS goes public on Toronto Stock Exchange under trading symbol
- 1998: Acquisition of the Implementer product line from Silvon Software, broadening its platform (AS/400) reach and marketshare
- 1999: Acquisition of Datafocus, a longtime OEM customer of the MKS Toolkit product line.
- 2000: Vertical Sky begins and ends
- 2000: Founder and CEO Randall Howard leaves the company
- 2001: Philip C. Deck joins MKS as CEO and chairman
- 2001: MKS Source Integrity Enterprise (multi-tier Java EE architecture) launched (later renamed to MKS Integrity)
- 2002: MKS officially changes its name from Mortice Kern Systems to MKS
- 2002: Introduced federated server model for remote geographic team support (an alternative to replication) capability built into MKS Integrity
- 2005: First release of requirements management feature set built within the MKS Integrity
- 2005: Opening of Asia Pacific division in Singapore
- 2006: First release of portfolio management capability into MKS Integrity
- 2006:
- 2006: First release of MKS X/Server (technology acquired from SCO)
- 2009: Official release of MKS Integrity 2009 and launch of Intelligent ALM solution positioning.
- 2009: Michael W. Harris appointed President and CEO and Philip C. Deck appointed as Executive Chairman
- 2010: Andrew M. Wertkin appointed Chief Technology Officer (CTO)
- 2011: MKS acquired by Parametric Technology Corporation PTC

== See also ==
- MKS Toolkit
- MKS Integrity
