= MinGW =

Compiler toolchain for Windows

- Developer: MinGW Project
- Release: 1998; 28 years ago
- Operating system: Microsoft Windows
- Platform: IA-32
- Type: Compiler toolchain
- License: GPL, LGPL, and GCC Runtime Library Exception (compiler/toolchain); mixed, primarily MIT and Public domain (runtime headers)
- Website: http://www.mingw.org/ at the Wayback Machine (archived 23 December 2020) (defunct)

MinGW ("Minimalist GNU for Windows") is a compiler toolchain for creating native Microsoft Windows applications. It provides a port of the GNU Compiler Collection (GCC) and related tools that generate executables targeting the Windows API without requiring a compatibility layer or emulation environment.

MinGW was developed to support native Windows development using GNU tools. Unlike POSIX-based environments such as Cygwin, MinGW targets the Windows API directly and does not attempt to provide a full Unix-like runtime environment.

It includes ports of essential GNU development tools, including GCC and GNU Binutils, along with a minimal Unix-like shell environment (MSYS) used to assist with build processes.

Later projects and distributions such as Mingw-w64 and MSYS2 provide modern, actively maintained environments for native Windows builds using GNU toolchains.

== Architecture ==
MinGW is designed to produce native Windows executables rather than provide a POSIX compatibility layer; unlike Cygwin-based toolchains, it links against standard Microsoft DLLs such as MSVCRT rather than a Unix emulation runtime.

Because MinGW does not provide a full POSIX environment, applications that rely on strictly POSIX-compliant process management, such as fork(), require modifications to compile or run correctly on Windows.

== Toolchain flow ==
The MinGW toolchain follows the standard GNU compilation pipeline adapted for the Windows platform:

1. Source code (C, C++, Fortran, etc.) is compiled by GCC into object files targeting Windows.
2. The assembler (GNU as) converts intermediate representations into machine code object files.
3. The linker (GNU ld) links object files with system libraries and runtime components.
4. Executables are produced in the Portable Executable (PE) format and run directly on Windows without a compatibility layer.

The use of the Portable Executable format distinguishes MinGW-generated binaries from typical Unix systems, which commonly use the ELF (Executable and Linkable Format) binary format.

== Comparison with Cygwin ==
Although both Cygwin and MinGW can be used to build software for Windows, they have different design goals. Cygwin provides a POSIX compatibility layer and a Unix-like runtime environment on Windows, while MinGW targets the Windows API directly and produces native Windows executables.

Programs built with Cygwin typically depend on the Cygwin runtime DLL, whereas MinGW-generated programs do not require such a compatibility layer.

== Programming language support ==
As a port of GCC, MinGW supports multiple programming languages, including C, C++, Objective-C, Objective-C++, Fortran, and Ada.

Compiled programs use the standard GCC runtime libraries, including libstdc++ for C++ applications and the GNU Fortran runtime libraries for Fortran applications.

== History ==
=== Early development ===
MinGW originated in the late 1990s to supply a minimal GNU-based development environment for Microsoft Windows. The project provided a way to compile open-source applications into native 32-bit Windows binaries.

=== Fork and ecosystem evolution ===
In 2007, the Mingw-w64 fork was created to add 64-bit Windows support and coverage of newer Windows APIs absent from the original project. MSYS2 followed in the 2010s, building on Mingw-w64 while adding the pacman package manager and a modernized distribution model.

== See also ==
- Mingw-w64
- Cygwin
- MSYS2
- GNU Compiler Collection
