= Microsoft Windows library files =

List of main shared-libraries of Microsoft Windows

The Microsoft Windows operating system and Microsoft Windows SDK support a collection of shared libraries that software can use to access the Windows API. This article provides an overview of the core libraries included with modern Windows installation, upon which most Windows applications are built.

== Library sources ==
The Windows operating system contains compiled versions of these libraries known as dynamically-linked libraries (.dll), which are executable libraries that can be used by multiple programs while only one copy of the library is loaded into memory. These are canonically referred to as system libraries and all programs installed on the system can utilize them.

The Windows SDK additionally distributes compiled versions of these libraries known as statically-linked libraries (.lib), which are non-executable libraries that, in whole or in part, can be embedded into a program when it is compiled. The most common Windows compilers being Microsoft Visual Studio and MinGW.

== Internal components ==
=== NTDLL.DLL ===
NTDLL.DLL exports the Windows Native API. The Native API is the interface used by user-mode components of the operating system that must operate without support from Win32 or other API subsystems. Most of this API is implemented NTDLL.DLL and at the upper edge of ntoskrnl.exe (and its variants), and the majority of exported symbols within these libraries are prefixed Nt, for example NtDisplayString(). Native APIs are also used to implement many of the "kernel APIs" or "base APIs" exported by KERNEL32.DLL. The large majority of Windows applications do not call NTDLL.DLL directly.

Applications that are linked directly against this library are said to use the native subsystem; the primary reason for their existence is to perform tasks that must run early in the system startup sequence before the Win32 subsystem is available. An obvious but important example is the creation of the Win32 subsystem process, csrss.exe. Before the csrss.exe process exists, no Win32 processes may be created, therefore the process that creates it (Smss.exe, the "session manager") must use the native subsystem. csrss.exe itself is such an application.

Despite having an ".exe" file extension, native applications cannot be executed by the user (or any program in the Win32 or other subsystems). An example is the autochk.exe binary that runs chkdsk during the system initialization "Blue Screen". Other prominent examples are the services that implement the various subsystems, such as csrss.exe.

Unlike Win32 applications, native applications instantiate within the Kernel runtime code (ntoskrnl.exe) and so they must have a different entry point (NtProcessStartup(), rather than WinMainCRTStartup() as is found in a Win32 application), obtain their command-line arguments via a pointer to an in-memory structure, manage their own memory using the Rtl heap API, (which the Win32 heap APIs are just wrappers around—no real difference there) and return execution with a call RtlExitUserProcess() (as opposed to ExitProcess()). A common library linked with Native applications is nt.lib, which contains startup code for Native applications, similar to how the C runtime provides startup code for Win32 apps.

Most of the Native API is not publicly documented or supported. This allows the API to evolve without having to guarantee backwards compatibility, and breaking changes are thus possible without notification. Native Applications can be built using the Windows Driver Development Kit.

== Win32 API ==
The libraries in this section each implement various subsets of the Win32 API.

=== KERNEL32.DLL ===
KERNEL32.DLL exposes to applications most of the Win32 base APIs, such as memory management, input/output (I/O) operations, process and thread creation, and synchronization functions.

=== GDI32.DLL ===
GDI32.DLL exports Graphics Device Interface (GDI) functions that perform primitive drawing functions for output to video displays and printers. It is used, for example, in the XP version of Paint. Applications call GDI functions directly to perform low-level drawing (line, rectangle, ellipse), text output, font management, and similar functions.

Initially, GDI supported 16 and 256 color EGA/VGA display cards and monochrome printers. The functionality has expanded over the years, and now includes support for things like TrueType fonts, alpha channels, and multiple monitors.

=== USER32.DLL ===
USER32.DLL implements the Windows USER component that creates and manipulates the standard elements of the Windows user interface, such as the desktop, windows, and menus. It thus enables programs to implement a graphical user interface (GUI) that matches the Windows look and feel. Programs call functions from Windows USER to perform operations such as creating and managing windows, receiving window messages (which are mostly user input such as mouse and keyboard events, but also notifications from the operating system), displaying text in a window, and displaying message boxes.

Many of the functions in USER32.DLL call upon GDI functions exported by GDI32.DLL to do the actual rendering of the various elements of the user interface. Some types of programs will also call GDI functions directly to perform lower-level drawing operations within a window previously created via USER32 functions.

=== COMCTL32.DLL ===
COMCTL32.DLL implements a wide variety of standard Windows controls, such as progress bars, and list views. It calls functions from both USER32.DLL and GDI32.DLL to create and manage the windows for these UI elements, place various graphic elements within them, and collect user input.

=== COMDLG32.DLL ===
COMDLG32.DLL, the Common Dialog Box Library, implements a wide variety of Windows dialog boxes intended to perform what Microsoft deems 'common application tasks', such as the file Open, Save, and Save As dialogs. Starting with the release of Windows Vista, Microsoft considers the "Open" and "Save as" dialog boxes provided by this library as deprecated and replaced by the 'Common Item Dialog API'.

=== WS2_32.DLL ===
WS2_32.DLL implements the Winsock API, which provides TCP/IP networking functions and provides partial, broken compatibility with other network APIs. wsock.dll and wsock32.dll are older versions for Win3.11 and Win95 compatibility.

=== ADVAPI32.DLL ===
ADVAPI32.DLL, the Advanced Windows 32 Base API DLL, provides security calls and functions for manipulating the Windows Registry.

=== NETAPI32.DLL ===
NETAPI32.DLL provides functions for querying and managing network interfaces.

=== OLE32.DLL ===
OLE32.DLL provides the Component Object Model, as well as Object Linking and Embedding.

== Other APIs ==
=== SHSCRAP.DLL ===
SHSCRAP.DLL is part of the Object Linking and Embedding (OLE) mechanism. It implements support for shell scrap files, which are automatically created when you drag selected content from an OLE-capable application into an Explorer window or desktop, but you can also use the Object Packager to create them. They can then be dragged into another OLE-capable application.

This functionality was removed from Windows Vista (and therefore later versions) to improve security and rid the operating system of generally unused functionality. Scrap (.shs) files have been used by viruses because they can contain a wide variety of files (including executable code), and the file extension is not shown even when "Hide file extensions from known file types" is disabled. The functionality can be restored by copying registry entries and the DLL from a Windows XP system.

=== WINMM.DLL ===
WINMM.DLL provides access to the original WinMM audio API.

=== IMM32.DLL ===
IMM32 is responsible for invoking and interacting with the Input Method Editor.

== Runtime libraries ==
=== MSVCRT.DLL, MSVCP*.DLL and CRTDLL.DLL ===
MSVCRT.DLL is the C standard library for the Visual C++ (MSVC) compiler from version 4.2 to 6.0. It provides programs compiled by these versions of MSVC with most of the standard C library functions. These include string manipulation, memory allocation, C-style input/output calls, and others. MSVCP*.DLL is the corresponding C++ library.

It has shipped with Windows versions since Windows 95 OSR2.5 for use by other Windows components; earlier versions shipped with the CRTDLL.DLL library instead. In older versions of Windows, programs which linked against MSVCRT.DLL were expected to install a compatible copy in the System32 folder, but this contributed to DLL Hell because many installers failed to check the library version against the installed version before replacing it.

Versions of MSVC before 4.0 and from 7.0 to 12.0 used differently named DLLs for each version (MSVCRT20.DLL, MSVCR70.DLL, MSVCR71.DLL, MSVCP110.DLL, etc.). Applications are required to install the appropriate version, and Microsoft offers Visual C++ Redistributable packages for this purpose, though Windows typically comes with one version already installed.

This runtime library is used by programs written in Visual C++ and a few other compilers (e.g. MinGW). Some compilers have their own runtime libraries.

=== UCRT ===
With Version 14.0 (Visual Studio 2015), most of the C/C++ runtime was moved into a new DLL, UCRTBASE.DLL, which conforms closely with C99. Universal C Run Time (UCRT) from Windows 10 onwards became a component part of Windows, so every compiler (either non MS, like GCC or Clang/LLVM) can link against UCRT. Additionally, C/C++ programs using UCRTBASE.DLL need to link against another new DLL, the Visual C++ Runtime. At Version 14.0, this was VCRUNTIME140.DLL. The name has the potential to change at future versions, but has not done so as far as of Version 17.0.

Source code for runtime libraries is included in Visual C++ for reference and debugging (e.g. in C:\Program Files\Microsoft Visual Studio 11.0\VC\crt\src).

=== Other runtime libraries ===
- ATL*.DLL – Active Template Library
- MFC*.DLL – Microsoft Foundation Classes
- MSVBVM60.DLL – Visual Basic 6.0 Virtual Machine (Visual Basic.NET programs require .NET Framework instead)
- VCOMP*.DLL – Microsoft OpenMP runtime
- VCRUNTIME*.DLL – Microsoft Visual C++ Runtime, for MSVC 14.0+
- MSVCIRT.DLL – Microsoft C++ Library, contains the deprecated C++ classes from <iostream.h> (note the file extension) for MS C 9 and 10 (MSVC 2.x, 4.x) (Back then, the draft C++ Standard Library was integrated within MSVCRT.DLL. It was split up with the release of Visual C++ 5.0)

=== .NET Framework libraries ===
Programs written in C#, Visual Basic.NET, C++/CLI and other .NET languages require the .NET Framework. It has many libraries (one of them is mscorlib.dll – Multilanguage Standard Common Object Runtime Library, formerly Microsoft Common Object Runtime Library) and so-called assemblies (e.g. System.Windows.Forms.dll).

== See also ==
- Architecture of Windows NT
- Booting process of Windows
- List of Microsoft Windows components
- Windows API
- Windows.h
- Dynamic-link library
