= Windows USER =

Component of Microsoft Windows

Windows USER is a component of the Microsoft Windows operating system that provides core functionality for building simple user interfaces. The component has existed in all versions of Windows, and includes functionality for window management, message passing, input processing and standard controls.

== Functionality and role ==
Windows USER provides a large part of the core user experience for Microsoft Windows. Historically, it was responsible for:

- Causing windows to be drawn (using GDI as a device-independent API for drawing primitives)
- Obscuring overlapping windows behind others
- Window size and positioning
- Providing all the standard window management controls (such as close boxes or title bars)
- Providing the standard Windows menu bar
- Providing of standard controls (such as button, List box or Edit Box)
- Providing dialog box management (short-cut keys, tab key processing)
- Processing all user input from the mouse and keyboard
- The desktop background image (until Windows 8)
- Drawing all standard visual elements
- Inter-process communication using Dynamic Data Exchange
- Mouse pointer cursor display and management
- Data transfer (Clipboard)

Gradually, as Windows has become larger and better factored, Windows USER has cooperated with other components to provide this functionality:

- Controls: Starting with Windows 95, new controls were placed into a separate common controls component. Starting with Windows XP, new implementations of the standard controls were also moved to that same component.
- Standard Visuals: Starting with Windows XP, visual elements are drawn by the Theming component.
- Windows Management experience: Starting with Windows Vista, drawing standard window management was moved from Windows USER to the Desktop Window Manager when the Aero theme is enabled. Starting with Windows 8, window frames are always drawn by DWM, except in the Windows Preinstallation Environment.
- Inter-program communication: Starting with Windows 3.1, Object Linking and Embedding replaced Dynamic Data Exchange as the recommended model for inter program communication.
- Menu bar: Starting in Windows 7, the Ribbon interface is a recommended replacement for the menu bar and context menus. It is provided by the UIRibbon component.
- Desktop wallpaper: Starting in Windows 8, drawing of the desktop wallpaper was moved to Windows Explorer, except in the Windows Preinstallation Environment, where the desktop wallpaper is drawn by the WallpaperHost.exe application. Wherever USER would have drawn the desktop background before, black is drawn, except when DWM is enabled, in which case, the user's accent will be drawn instead.
- Mouse pointer: Starting in Windows Vista when DWM is enabled, drawing of the mouse pointer is managed by it. However, starting in Windows 11, it will no longer display with DWM disabled, unless the file %SystemRoot%\System32\DWMInit.dll does not exist.

== Developer experience ==
Windows USER implements abstractions that are used to build Windows applications. These include

- HWND (Handle to Window)

The HWND is the basic unit of visual display and input in the Windows developer platform. All visual elements either have their own HWNDs or live as part of a larger HWND. Many functions in Windows USER manipulate properties on HWNDs such as size, position and title. Each HWND also has a communication channel (WNDPROC - Window Procedure) for delivery of messages.

Windows are managed as a tree, with the desktop window at the root of the hierarchy. Child windows are usually (but not always) visually contained within their parents.

- MSG (Message)

Applications and the operating system communicate with HWNDs using messages. A window message is the combination of a target HWND, a message code, and other details such as mouse position.

- Message Loop

By combining calls to Windows USER in the right way, a Windows application processes messages. The core Windows message loop (including calls to GetMessage, TranslateMessage and DispatchMessage) is at the core of any Windows application.

Developer functionality related to Windows USER is provided in the C header file winuser.h.

== Implementation ==
In 16-bit versions of Windows, Windows USER was implemented as a file called user.exe. The file extension here was a misnomer, as Windows USER was in fact always a dynamic-link library.

In 32-bit versions of Windows, the 32-bit version of Windows USER is called user32.dll and is located in the System32 directory, while compatibility with 16-bit applications is provided by having a modified version of user.exe also present.

In 64-bit versions of Windows, the 64-bit implementation of Windows USER is called user32.dll and is located in the System32 directory, while a modified 32-bit version (also called user32.dll) is present in the SysWOW64 directory.

== See also ==
- Graphics Device Interface (GDI)
- Microsoft Windows library files
