= Moshe Dunie =

Israeli-born American executive and investor

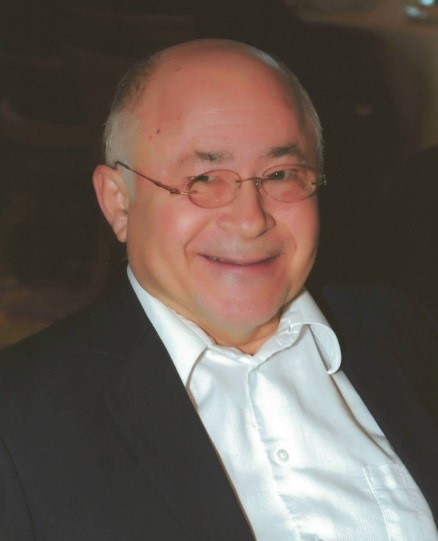
- Occupations: CEO & Founder, Dunie Investments & Consulting
- Website: Corporate Bio, Twitter

Moshe Dunie is an Israeli-born American executive and investor in the Greater Seattle Area best known for his executive roles at Microsoft in 1988–1999, culminating as Vice President of the Windows Division. Moshe Dunie is serving on the Board of Governors of the Technion, Israel Institute of Technology. Dunie served as the president of the American Jewish Committee (AJC) Seattle from 2006–2009 and served on the American Jewish Committee National Board. In his role, Dunie interacted with political and business leaders around the world promoting human rights. At Microsoft, Moshe Dunie was responsible for the releases of Windows NT 3.1, NT 3.5, NT 3.51 and NT 4.0 partnering with Dave Cutler. Then as VP of the Windows Operating System Division, Moshe Dunie led the teams that delivered Windows 98, and took Windows 2000 to its final beta release. Moshe Dunie oversaw over 3,000 full-time division engineers and 1,500 contractors. He collaborated with partners such as Intel, PC OEMs, application developers and enterprise customers, initiating a Rapid Deployment Program and extensive beta testing. Microsoft Israel R&D centre and engineering groups in Europe and Asia reported to Dunie as an international extension of the Windows division.

== Early career ==
Moshe Dunie was born on November 14, 1949, in Israel. His mother was an Auschwitz survivor. He studied Electrical Engineering at the Technion – Israel Institute of Technology, focusing on both hardware and software engineering. Dunie graduated with a BSc degree in 1971. He received his MBA from Golden Gate University, graduating with a 4.0 GPA from their special Silicon Valley executive MBA program.

Israel Air Force Test Range – After the Technion Dunie served at the Israel Air Force Test Range for five years. As an officer he led technical teams focused on development and testing of advanced avionics. This included the development of Israel’s initial Remotely Piloted Vehicle (RPV), working with RPV pioneer Al Ellis.

Eljim & Astronautics – In 1977 Dunie developed submarine real time software at Eljim Ltd. After Elbit purchased Eljim, Dunie joined Astronautics Ltd. As software team leader he was responsible for the development of the real-time software for the Israeli Kfir's airborne computer and for an advanced tactical computer for the General Dynamics F-16 fighter aircraft using bit-slice technology. Dunie wrote the assembly code for the mapping and networking software.

Landis & Gyr Systems – In 1981 Dunie joined Landis & Gyr Systems in San Jose, Silicon Valley, first as a software developer and after a year as the software manager responsible for the development of a microprocessor based Supervisory and Data Acquisition (SCADA) master station managing the electric grid for electric utilities. Dunie personally developed the real time operating system, the implementation of the DDCMP communications protocol, and parts of the UI.

== Microsoft ==
Dunie joined Microsoft Corporation in August 1988 as Project Manager for OS/2. He partnered with Dave Cutler building and leading the teams that delivered the first release of Windows NT, NT 3.1, on July 26, 1993. Cutler focused on NT architecture and Dunie on release management and quality. Both reported to Executive VP Paul Maritz. Next Dunie led the releases of Windows NT 3.5 (09/08/94), NT 3.51 (05/30/95), and NT 4.0 (07/29/96) partnering again with Cutler and reporting to Jim Allchin. Dunie was promoted to Vice President on July 26, 1996. On September 16, 1996. Dunie was given complete responsibility for all Windows NT and Windows 98 development teams. Dunie was the first Microsoft executive to be responsible for both the Windows 9x consumer focused development team and Windows NT enterprise focused team. After Windows 98 release, Dunie integrated the Win98 team into his Windows NT 5 team. Dunie led the Windows 2000 (NT 5) development team from the early design stage to code completion and final Beta release in December 1998. He initiated with Intel the NetPC. Additionally Dunie was in charge of Microsoft Israel Development Center delivering Microsoft Proxy Server, Windows NT Embedded, Windows Message Queue and Windows Terminal Server. Dunie left the Windows Development team at the end of 1998 taking a well-earned sabbatical after delivering ten major products. In his email announcing Dunie’s departure Jim Allchin wrote “Moshe has done as much as anyone at Microsoft to build the amazing Windows asset that we have today. There are few jobs that are as challenging and complicated, in any industry, as those that Moshe has had to face and master. Above all, Moshe has led by example through his incredible dedication - to his team, to Windows, to Microsoft, to our customers”.

After his Sabbatical Dunie reported to Paul Maritz, working with Windows 2000 strategic customers. Dunie retired from Microsoft on October 8, wanting to spend time with his children, Doron (born 1983) and Orlene (born 1986), before they leave to university.

== American Jewish Committee ==
Dunie joined AJC Seattle in 2002, serving for 4 years as co-chair of the Seattle Jewish Film Festival. Then Dunie was elected as the president of the American Jewish Committee (AJC) Seattle in 2006–2009 and served on the American Jewish Committee National Board. In his role Dunie collaborated with world leaders, ambassadors, community leaders and business leaders to enhance the well-being of the Jewish people and to advance human rights for all. In addition to serving in these organizations, he also wrote articles arguing for peace in Israel and the surrounding countries by eliminating "extremist" groups that seek to destroy Israel.

== Technion and investments ==
Moshe Dunie is serving on the Board of Governors of the Technion, Israel Institute of Technology. He is Chairman Emeritus of American Technion Society in Seattle.

Dunie has been an active investor in startups and established companies, primarily in high-technology. He has been a consultant for startup CEOs and executives.
