= Application Programming Interface for Windows =

Proposed software compatibility standard

The Application Programming Interface for Windows (APIW) Standard is a specification of the Microsoft Windows 3.1 API drafted by Willows Software. It is the successor to previously proposed Public Windows Interface standard. It was created in an attempt to establish a vendor-neutral, platform-independent, open standard of the 16-bit Windows API not controlled by Microsoft.

== Creation ==
By the end of 1990, Windows 3.0 was the top-selling software. The various graphical Windows applications had already started to reduce training time and enhance productivity on personal computers. At the same time, various Unix and Unix-based operating systems dominated technical workstations and departmental servers. The idea of a consistent application environment across heterogeneous environments was compelling to both enterprise customers and software developers.

On May 5, 1993, Sun Microsystems announced Windows Application Binary Interface (WABI), a product to run Windows software on Unix, and the Public Windows Interface (PWI) initiative, an effort to standardize a subset of the popular 16-bit Windows APIs. The PWI consortium's aims were stated as turning the proprietary Windows API into an "open, publicly available specification" and for the evolution of this specification to be the responsibility of "a neutral body". The consortium, counting Sun, IBM, Hewlett Packard and Novell among its members, proposed PWI to various companies and organizations including X/Open, IEEE and Unix International. The previous day, Microsoft had announced SoftPC, a Windows to Unix product created by Insignia Solutions as part of a program where Microsoft licensed their Windows source code to select third parties, which in the following year became known as Windows Interface Source Environment (WISE). Later that month, Microsoft also announced Windows NT, a version of Windows designed to run on workstations and servers.

== ECMA involvement ==
In February 1994, the PWI Specification Committee sent a draft specification to X/Open—who rejected it in March, after being threatened by Microsoft's assertion of intellectual property rights (IPR) over the Windows APIs—and the European Computer Manufacturers' Association (ECMA). In September, now part of an ECMA delegation, they made an informational presentation about the project at the ISO SC22 plenary meeting in The Hague, Netherlands. Their goal was to make it an ISO standard in order to force Microsoft to comply with it (in Windows) or risk not being able sell to European or Asian governments who can only buy ISO standards-compliant products.

In April 1995, Willows Software, Inc. (formerly Multiport, Inc.) a Saratoga, California-based Canopy-funded company, that had been working on Windows to Unix technologies (inherited from then defunct Hunter Systems, Inc.) since early 1993, joined the ad hoc ECMA group. This group became Technical Committee 37 in August (about the time Windows 95 was released). Willows vowed to complete a full draft specification by the end of the year. In October, the draft specification was completed under the name Application Programming Interface for Windows (APIW). This was accepted as ECMA-234 in December and was put on the fast-track program to become an ISO standard.

== ISO delay ==
Again, Microsoft claimed intellectual property over Windows APIs and ISO put the standard on hold pending proof of their claims. The delay lasted until November 1997, when, hearing no response from Microsoft, ISO announced they were pushing through with the standard. However, there is no record of it ever being approved as an ISO standard.

== See also ==
- Willows Toolkit for UNIX – American software company
- Willows RT for Embedded Systems – American software company
- Novell Corsair – Linux distribution of the late 1990s and early 2000s
- Caldera Network Desktop – Linux distribution of the late 1990s and early 2000s
