= Windows NT processor scheduling =

Windows NT processor scheduling refers to the process by which Windows NT determines which job (task) should be run on the computer processor at which time. Without scheduling, the processor would give attention to jobs based on when they arrived in the queue, which is usually not optimal. As part of the scheduling, the processor gives a priority level to different processes running on the machine. When two processes are requesting service at the same time, the processor performs the jobs for the one with the higher priority.

There are six named priority levels:

- Realtime
- High
- Above Normal
- Normal
- Below Normal
- Low

These levels have associated numbers with them. Applications start at a base priority level of eight. The system dynamically adjusts the priority level to give all applications access to the processor. Priority levels 0 - 15 are used by dynamic applications. Priority levels 16- 31 are reserved for real-time applications.

== Random boosting ==
Random boosting is a strategy used by the scheduler in Microsoft Windows to avoid deadlock due to priority inversion. Ready threads holding locks are randomly boosted in priority and allowed to run long enough to exit the critical section. If the thread doesn't get enough time to release the lock, it will get another chance.

This strategy is no longer used in the latest versions of Windows and has been replaced by a strategy called AutoBoost.

== Affinity ==
In a multiprocessing environment with more than one logical processor (i.e. multiple cores or hyperthreading), more than one task can be running at the same time. However, a process or a thread can be set to run on only a subset of the available logical processors. The Windows Task Manager utility offers a user interface for this at the process level.
