= Award Software =

American software company

Award Software International Inc.
- Company type: Public
- Traded as: Nasdaq: AWRD
- Industry: Computer hardware & software
- Founded: 1983 (San Jose, California)
- Founders: Rene Vishney; Bob Stillman
- Defunct: 28 September 1998
- Fate: Merged with Phoenix Technologies
- Headquarters: Los Gatos, California
- Products: BIOS software Semiconductors; Data management tools
- Website: award.com at the Wayback Machine (archived 1997-10-23)

Award Software International Inc. was a BIOS manufacturer founded in 1983 by Rene Vishney and Bob Stillman in San Jose, California. In 1984, the company moved its international headquarters to Los Gatos, California, United States.

== History ==
In 1988, Bob Stillman left the company. The company was held privately by Rene Vishney (chairman of the board) and his wife, Deborah Lee (Marlow) Vishney (Chief Executive Officer).

By 1990 Award BIOS reportedly led among Asian PC clone makers, ahead of Phoenix Technologies's Phoenix BIOS. In 1993, Award was sold to Taiwan company GCH Systems Ltd. (now defunct).

On 24 October 1996, Award Software International Inc. announced its initial public offering.

On 16 June 1997, Award Software International Inc. announced the acquisition of BIOS upgrades provider Unicore Software, Inc. making it a subsidiary of Award.

On 16 April 1998, Phoenix Technologies and Award Software International Inc. announced the completion of a definitive merger agreement where Phoenix Technologies Ltd. would become the surviving corporate entity following the merger completion on 30 June 1998. The merger was completed on 28 September 1998.

== Subsidiaries ==
- Award Software Europe
- Award Software Hong Kong, Ltd
- Award Software Japan, KK: Established in 1997-06-03.
- Award Software International, Inc.
- Unicore Software, Inc.

== Products ==
Award BIOS during booting

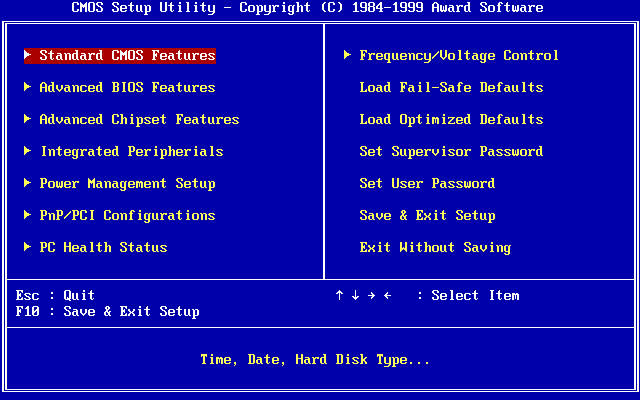
Award BIOS setup utility on a standard PC

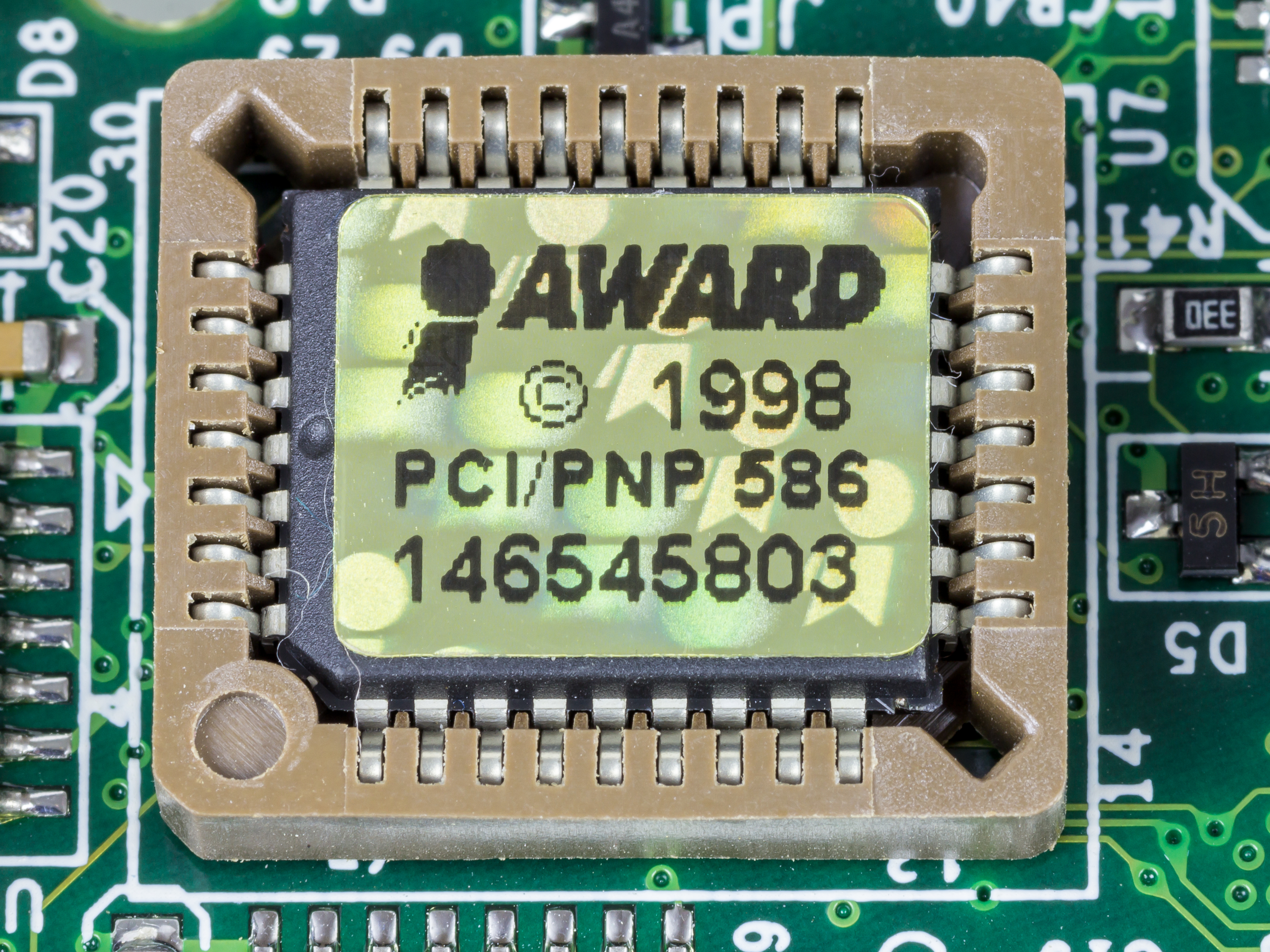
Award BIOS in an Atmel AT29C010A PLCC flash memory

- AwardBIOS: It is a series of BIOSes developed by Award Software, and later Phoenix Technologies. Includes BIOSes labeled as Award Modular BIOS and Award Medallion BIOS.
  - Note: After the completion of the merger in 1998, the copyright holder remained as Award Software, Inc. for some time until 2001–2002 when it changed to Phoenix Technologies Ltd. Likewise, BIOSes and UEFIs for Gigabyte Technology motherboards still attributed copyright to Award Software (and as AWRDACPI in Phoenix UEFIs) until the end of 2012 when it switched to AMI's Aptivo line of UEFI solutions.
- CardWare: It is a PC Card software product.
- EliteBIOS: It is the system management software product that Award Software designs, develops and markets to the manufacturers of desktop, server, mobile and embedded systems.
- PC DIAG: Diagnostic software
- CheckIt POSTcard: Power On Self Test system diagnostic board
  - ISA POSTcard: ISA Diagnostic hardware
  - PCI POSTcard: PCI Diagnostic hardware
- Preboot Manager
- SMSAccess: System management software suite
  - DMIAccess: Desktop Management Interface utilities
  - LMAccess: Microsoft Windows NT and Windows 95-based hardware status monitoring and alarm application
  - MPCAccess
  - RPBAccess: Remote, preboot diagnostic and repair software
- USBAccess: It is a USB-host software targeted for consumer electronics and embedded device manufacturers.
- WWWAccess: Product suite for Internet appliance applications using Intel x86 embedded design.
  - APIAccess: Integrates Win32 applications into real-time systems. Formerly Willows Toolkit for UNIX and Willows RT for Embedded Systems from Willows Software.

== See also ==
- BIOS features comparison
