= Server Core =

Windows Server installation option

Server Core is a minimalistic Microsoft Windows Server installation option, debuted in Windows Server 2008. Server Core provides a server environment with functionality scaled back to core server features, and because of limited features, it has reduced servicing and management requirements, attack surface, disk and memory usage. Andrew Mason, a program manager on the Windows Server team, noted that a primary motivation for producing a Server Core variant of Windows Server 2008 was to reduce the attack surface of the operating system, and that about 70% of the security vulnerabilities in Microsoft Windows from the prior five years would not have affected Server Core. A surface level examination would show that no Windows Explorer shell is installed. All configuration and maintenance is done entirely through command-line interface windows, or by connecting to the machine remotely using Microsoft Management Console (MMC), remote server administration tools, and PowerShell.

== Configuration levels ==
As Server Core implementations matured, it has evolved from an installation option to a configuration level. Server Core is less looked down as a stripped version, instead the full GUI version is being thought of having a rarely needed client layer on top of the server layer.

Configuration levels in order of increasing complexity for Windows server installations
Install type	Nano Server	Server Core	Minimal Server Interface	Server with a GUI or “Full Server”	Desktop Experience
Availability	Server 2016	Server 2008–	Server 2012–2012 R2	–2012 R2	Server 2008–

In newer Windows versions there is more granularity in configuration levels:

== History ==
=== Windows Server 2008 ===
Windows Server 2008 was the first Windows Server with the Server Core option (in all editions, except IA-64). Though no Windows Explorer shell is installed, Notepad and some control panel applets, such as Regional Settings, are available. Server Core on Windows Server 2008 does not include the Internet Explorer or many other features not related to core server features. A Server Core machine can be configured for several basic roles: Active Directory Domain Services, Active Directory Application Mode (ADAM), DNS Server, DHCP server, file server, print server, Windows Media Server, IIS 7 web server and Hyper-V virtual server. Server Core can also be used to create a cluster with high availability using failover clustering or network load balancing.

As Server Core is not a different version of Windows Server 2008, but simply an installation option, it has the same file versions and default configurations as the full server version. In Windows Server 2008 and 2008 R2, if a server was installed as Server Core, it cannot be changed to the full GUI version and vice versa.

To make administration of a Server Core machine easier, a Windows script called "scregedit.wsf" was included to make basic changes like turning Automatic Updates on or off, turning Remote Desktop on or off and change page file settings.

=== Windows Server 2008 R2 ===
In Windows Server 2008 R2, Server Core includes a subset of the .NET Framework, so that some applications (including ASP.NET web sites and Windows PowerShell 2.0) can be used. Having .NET support, it is also the first Server Core version where Microsoft SQL Server can be installed (a supported scenario only with SQL Server 2012+). Server Manager has become remoteable. New roles had been enabled to run on Server Core, including Active Directory Certificate Services and the File Server Resource Manager component of the File Services role. WoW64 is available by default, but can be disabled.

In addition to the DISM command, a new command line Server Configuration tool (Sconfig.cmd) has arrived to configure and manage several common aspects of Server Core installations. Server Manager can be used to remotely administer a Server Core machine.

=== Windows Server 2012 ===
Unlike its predecessors, Windows Server 2012 can switch between "Server Core" and server with a DE installation option without reinstallation. Server Core is now the default configuration level. There is also a new installation option, "minimal server interface" that allows some GUI elements such as MMC and Server Manager to run, but without the normal desktop, shell or default programs like File Explorer. The "minimal server interface" is in fact a server role (Server-Gui-Mgmt-Infra), the full GUI version contains the Server-Gui-Shell role as well. Some new roles are available, like Windows Server Update Services (WSUS), Active Directory Rights Management Server, and Routing and Remote Access Server, and many new features as well.

=== Windows Server 2012 R2 ===
In Windows Server 2012 R2, Windows Defender is available in a Server Core installation, and is installed and enabled by default.

=== Windows Server 2016 ===
Windows Server 2016 has a minimal footprint installation option (smaller than Server Core) called Nano Server, optimized for Windows Server Containers and Hyper-V Containers, as well as other cloud-optimized scenarios. Microsoft removed the GUI stack, WoW64 and Windows Installer. There is no local logon or Remote Desktop support.

On installation, Server 2016 offers two options: Windows Server 2016 (which is Server Core) and Windows Server 2016 Desktop Experience. Switching between these versions, as is available in Server 2012, is not supported (the possibility was removed in Technical Preview 3).

== Supported GUI programs ==
=== Windows Server 2016 ===
==== Some graphical programs supported in Core version ====
Subset of Control Panel

- control.exe intl.cpl - Region
- control.exe timedate.cpl - Date and Time

regedit.exe - Registry Editor

notepad.exe - Notepad

cmd.exe - Command prompt

msinfo32.exe - System Information

msiexec.exe - Windows Installer

taskmgr.exe - Task Manager

powershell.exe - Windows PowerShell

iscsicpl.exe - ISCSI Initiator Properties

subset of Explorer function - all what can be done from File - Open dialog like

- File Copy, Paste, Rename, Delete, make new Folder
- Disk properties including tools on dialog like Error check

==== Other working programs with GUI ====
adexplorer.exe - Sysinternals Active Directory Explorer

procexp.exe - Sysinternals Process Explorer

procmon.exe - Sysinternals Process Monitor

tcpview.exe - Sysinternals TCPview

vmmap.exe - Sysinternals VMMap

rammap.exe - Sysinternals RamMap 1.50

portqueryui.exe - Microsoft PortQueryUI Version 1.0

== See also ==
- MinWin
