= Shell Scrap Object File =

Depreciated Windows file format

- Filename extension: .shs
- Developed by: Microsoft
- Type of format: Proprietary
- Container for: OLE objects

The SHS file extension is primarily associated with Shell Scrap Object Files produced by Microsoft Windows. They are created by selecting part of a document content and then dragging and dropping it outside the document program window (e.g. selecting some lines of text in a Word document, dragging and dropping them on the desktop). The operating system will create an .shs file with the selected content, which will be useless alone, and only readable by dragging the icon and dropping it in a program which supports this mechanism.

Versions of Windows that support SHS are Windows 95, NT 4.0, 98, ME, 2000, XP, and Server 2003. Microsoft removed this function in Windows Vista, and it is not included with Vista or after with Windows 7, Windows 8, and Windows 10.
