= Windows NT 3.x =

Windows NT 3.x may refer to either of, or all of the following versions of Microsoft Windows:

- Windows NT 3.1
- Windows NT 3.5
- Windows NT 3.51
