= Booting process of Windows =

Process by which the Microsoft Windows of operating system family initializes

The booting process of Microsoft Windows varies between different releases.

== DOS-based Windows ==
=== Windows 1.x/2.x ===
In Windows versions 1.01 to Windows 2.11, the system is loaded when WIN.COM is executed within MS-DOS. It then loads WIN100.BIN or WIN200.BIN and WIN100.OVL or WIN200.OVL, along with the configuration settings file WIN.INI. The default shell is the MS-DOS Executive (MSDOS.EXE).

The modules GDI.EXE, KERNEL.EXE and USER.EXE, fonts, and the various device drivers (such as COMM.DRV, MOUSE.DRV, KEYBOARD.DRV) are incorporated in WIN100.BIN/WIN200.BIN and WIN100.OVL/WIN200.OVL.

In Windows/386, WIN200.BIN starts WIN386.EXE.

=== Windows 3.x/9x ===
In Windows 3.x and 95/98/ME, the boot loader phase is handled by MS-DOS. During the boot phase, CONFIG.SYS and AUTOEXEC.BAT are executed, along with the configuration settings files WIN.INI and SYSTEM.INI. Virtual device drivers are also loaded in the startup process: they are most commonly loaded from the registry (HKLM\System\CurrentControlSet\Services\VxD) or from the SYSTEM.INI file.

MS-DOS starts WIN.COM.

In Windows 3.x, the WIN.COM starts DOSX.EXE (standard mode) or WIN386.EXE (386 enhanced mode). The DOSX.EXE (the standard mode kernel) later starts KRNL286.EXE (the Win16 API); the WIN386.EXE (the enhanced mode kernel) later starts KRNL386.EXE (the Win16 API in enhanced mode). Later, the Program Manager (PROGMAN.EXE) shell is started.

In Windows 9x, the WIN.COM starts VMM32.VXD. When all system configuration files and device drivers have been loaded, the 16-bit modules, KRNL386.EXE, GDI.EXE, and USER.EXE, are loaded, then the 32-bit DLLs (KERNEL32.DLL, GDI32.DLL, and USER32.DLL) are loaded. The 32-bit VxD message server (MSGSRV32) starts MPREXE.EXE, which is responsible for loading the network logon client (such as Client for Microsoft Networks, Microsoft Family Logon or Windows Logon). When a user is logging on to Windows, the startup sound is played, the shell (usually EXPLORER.EXE) is loaded from the [boot] section of the SYSTEM.INI file, and startup items are loaded.

In all versions of Windows 9x except ME, it is also possible to load Windows by booting to a DOS prompt and typing "win". There are some command line switches that can be used with the WIN command: with the /D switch, Windows boots to safe mode, and with the /D:n switch, Windows boots to safe mode with networking. The latter switch only works properly with Windows 95. In Windows 3.1, additional options are available, such as /3, which starts Windows in 386 enhanced mode, and /S, which starts Windows in standard mode

A startup sound was first added in Windows 3.0 after installing the Multimedia Extensions (MME), but not enabled by default until Windows 3.1.

== Windows CE ==
Windows CE uses WCELDR as its second stage boot loader in x86 platforms; or uses EBOOT as its boot loader in ARM platforms. On the startup process, NK.BIN boot image or NK.EXE kernel is loaded by the WCELDR or EBOOT bootloader.

== Windows NT ==
In Windows NT, the booting process is initiated by NTLDR in versions before Vista and the Windows Boot Manager (BOOTMGR) in Vista and later. The boot loader is responsible for accessing the file system on the boot drive, starting ntoskrnl.exe, and loading boot-time device drivers into memory. Since Windows Vista, once all the boot and system drivers have been loaded, the Windows Startup Application (wininit.exe) starts service control manager (services.exe) to start Windows services, and the Windows Startup Application starts the session manager (smss.exe) which begins the login process. After the user has successfully logged into the machine, winlogon applies User and Computer Group Policy setting and runs startup programs declared in the Windows Registry and in "Startup" folders. Finally the Windows shell will be started; in Windows NT 3.x, the shell is usually Program Manager, and in Windows NT 4.0 and later, the shell is usually Windows Explorer.

== See also ==
- Booting process of Android devices
- Booting process of Linux
- Booting process of macOS
