= Windows API =

Microsoft's core set of application programming interfaces on Windows

- The Win32 subsystem shown next to the POSIX and OS/2 subsystem in the architecture of Windows NT (Later Win64 is also available.)
- Developer: Microsoft
- Release: November 20, 1985; 40 years ago
- Operating system: Microsoft Windows, OS/2
- Predecessor: DOS API
- Type: API
- License: Proprietary
- Website: learn.microsoft.com/windows/apps/

The Windows API, informally WinAPI, is the foundational application programming interface (API) that allows a computer program to access the features of the Microsoft Windows operating system in which the program is running. Programs typically access this API using system libraries, which are shared libraries.

Each major version of the Windows API has a distinct name that identifies a compatibility aspect of that version. For example, Win32 is the major version of Windows API that runs on 32-bit systems. The name, Windows API, collectively refers to all versions of this capability of Windows.

Microsoft provides developer support via a software development kit, Microsoft Windows SDK, which includes documentation and tools for building software based on the Windows API.

== Services ==
Microsoft groups its current desktop Windows API documentation into 13 areas: user interface; the Windows environment and Shell; user input and messaging; data access and storage; diagnostics; graphics and multimedia; devices; system services; security and identity; application installation and servicing; system administration and management; networking and internet; and deprecated or legacy APIs. The subsections below describe historically prominent libraries and service groups rather than every API in the current index.

=== Base Services ===
Base services include features such as the file system, devices, processes, threads, and error handling. These functions reside in kernel.exe, krnl286.exe or krnl386.exe files on 16-bit Windows, and kernel32.dll and KernelBase.dll on 32 and 64 bit Windows. These files reside in the folder \Windows\System32 on all versions of Windows.

=== Advanced Services ===
Advanced services include features beyond the kernel like the Windows registry, shutdown/restart the system (or abort), start/stop/create a Windows service, manage user accounts. These functions reside in advapi32.dll and advapires32.dll on 32-bit Windows.

=== Graphics Device Interface ===
The Graphics Device Interface (GDI) component provides features to output graphics content to monitors, printers, and other output devices. It resides in gdi.exe on 16-bit Windows, and gdi32.dll on 32-bit Windows in user-mode. Kernel-mode GDI support is provided by win32k.sys which communicates directly with the graphics driver.

=== User Interface ===
The User Interface component provides features to create and manage screen windows and most basic controls, such as buttons and scrollbars, receive mouse and keyboard input, and other functions associated with the graphical user interface (GUI) part of Windows. This functional unit resides in user.exe on 16-bit Windows, and user32.dll on 32-bit Windows. Since Windows XP versions, the basic controls reside in comctl32.dll, together with the common controls (Common Control Library).

=== Common Dialog Box Library ===
The Common Dialog Box Library provides standard dialog boxes to open and save files, choose color and font, etc. The library resides in a file called commdlg.dll on 16-bit Windows, and comdlg32.dll on 32-bit Windows. It is grouped under the User Interface category of the API.

=== Common Control Library ===
The Common Control Library provides access to advanced user interface controls, including things like status bars, progress bars, toolbars and tabs. The library resides in a DLL file called commctrl.dll on 16-bit Windows, and comctl32.dll on 32-bit Windows. It is grouped under the User Interface category of the API.

=== Windows Shell ===
The Windows Shell component provides access to the operating system shell. The component resides in shell.dll on 16-bit Windows, and shell32.dll on 32-bit Windows. The Shell Lightweight Utility Functions are in shlwapi.dll. It is grouped under the User Interface category of the API.

=== Network Services ===
Network Services provide access to the various networking abilities of the operating system. Its subcomponents include NetBIOS, Winsock, NetDDE, remote procedure call (RPC) and many more. This component resides in netapi32.dll on 32-bit Windows.

=== Web ===
The Internet Explorer (IE) web browser exposes APIs and as such could be considered part of the Windows API. IE has been included with the operating system since Windows 95 OSR2 and has provided web-related services to applications since Windows 98.

== Program interaction ==
The Windows API is a C language-based API. Functions and data structures are consumable via C syntax by including windows.h, but the API can be consumed via any programming language that can inter-operate with the API data structures and calling conventions for function calls and callbacks.

Of note, the implementation of API functions has been developed in several languages other than C. (Note: Both Pascal and x86 assembly were heavily used in earlier versions, before C became dominant. A reminiscence of this is that the API functions still use the Pascal calling convention to restore the stack from pushed parameters after a call (although they expect parameters pushed from right to left, as most C compilers do, by default).)

Despite the fact that C is not an object-oriented programming (OOP) language, the Windows API is somewhat object-oriented due to its use of handles. Various other technologies from Microsoft and others make this object-oriented aspect more apparent by using an OOP language such as C++ — see Microsoft Foundation Class Library (MFC), Visual Component Library (VCL), GDI+. Of note, Windows 8 provides the Windows API and the WinRT API, which is implemented in C++ and is object-oriented by design.

Windows.pas is a Delphi unit that exposes the features of Windows API – the Pascal equivalent of windows.h.

== Related technologies ==
Many Microsoft technologies use the Windows API—as most software running on Windows does. As middle-ware between Windows API and an application, the following technologies provide some access to Windows API. Some technologies are described as wrapping Windows API, but this is debatable since they don't provide or expose all of the capabilities of Windows API.

- Microsoft Foundation Class Library (MFC) exposes some of Windows API functionality in C++ classes, and thus allows a more object-oriented way to interact with the API.
- Active Template Library (ATL) is a C++ template library that provides some Windows API access.
- Windows Template Library (WTL) was developed as an extension to ATL, and intended as a smaller alternative to MFC.
- Most application frameworks for Windows provide some access to Windows API, including .NET runtime and Java virtual machine and any other programming languages targeting Windows.
- Various technologies for communicating between components and applications – starting with Dynamic Data Exchange (DDE), which was superseded by Object Linking and Embedding (OLE) and later by the Component Object Model (COM), Automation Objects, ActiveX controls, and the .NET Framework.

Although almost all Windows programs use the Windows API, on the Windows NT line of operating systems, programs that start early in the Windows startup process use the Native API instead.

== History ==
The Windows API has always exposed a large part of the underlying structure of the Windows systems to programmers. This had the advantage of giving them much flexibility and power over their applications, but also creates great responsibility in how applications handle various low-level, sometimes tedious, operations that are associated with a graphical user interface.

For example, a beginning C programmer will often write the simple "hello world" as their first assignment. The working part of the program is only a single printf line within the main subroutine. The overhead for linking to the standard I/O library is also only one line:

#include <stdio.h>

int main(void) {
    printf("Hello, World!\n");
}

Charles Petzold, who wrote several books about programming for the Windows API, said: "The original hello world program in the Windows 1.0 SDK was a bit of a scandal. HELLO.C was about 150 lines long, and the HELLO.RC resource script had another 20 or so more lines. (...) Veteran programmers often curled up in horror or laughter when encountering the Windows hello-world program." Petzold explains that while it was the first Windows sample programs developers were introduced to, it was quite "fancy" and more complex than needed. Tired of people ridiculing the length of the sample, he eventually reduced it to a simple MessageBox call.

Over the years, various changes and additions were made to Windows systems, and the Windows API changed and grew to reflect this. The Windows API for Windows 1.0 supported fewer than 450 function calls, whereas modern versions of the Windows API support thousands. However, in general, the interface remained fairly consistent, and an old Windows 1.0 application will still look familiar to a programmer who is used to the modern Windows API.

Microsoft has made an effort to maintain backward compatibility. To achieve this, when developing new versions of Windows, Microsoft sometimes implemented workarounds to allow compatibility with third-party software that used the prior version in an undocumented or even inadvisable way. Raymond Chen, a Microsoft developer who works on the Windows API, has said: "I could probably write for months solely about bad things apps do and what we had to do to get them to work again (often in spite of themselves). Which is why I get particularly furious when people accuse Microsoft of maliciously breaking applications during OS upgrades. If any application failed to run on Windows 95, I took it as a personal failure."

One of the largest changes to the Windows API was the transition from Win16 (shipped in Windows 3.1 and older) to Win32 (Windows NT and Windows 95 and up). While Win32 was originally introduced with Windows NT 3.1 and Win32s allowed use of a Win32 subset before Windows 95, it was not until Windows 95 that widespread porting of applications to Win32 began. To ease the transition, in Windows 95, for developers outside and inside Microsoft, a complex scheme of API thunks was used that could allow 32-bit code to call into 16-bit code (for most of Win16 APIs) and vice versa. Flat thunks allowed 32-bit code to call into 16-bit libraries, and the scheme was used extensively inside Windows 95's libraries to avoid porting the whole OS to Win32 in one batch. In Windows NT, the OS was pure 32-bit, except parts for compatibility with 16-bit applications, and only generic thunks were available to thunk from Win16 to Win32, as for Windows 95. The Platform SDK shipped with a compiler that could produce the code needed for these thunks. Versions of 64-bit Windows are also able to run 32-bit applications via WoW64. The SysWOW64 folder located in the Windows folder on the OS drive contains several tools to support 32-bit applications.

== Major versions ==
Each version of Microsoft Windows contains a version of Windows API, and almost every new version of Microsoft Windows has introduced additions and changes to the Windows API.

The name, Windows API, refers to essentially the same capability in each version of Windows, but there is another name for this capability that is based on major architectural aspects of the Windows version that contains it. When there was only one version, it was simply called Windows API. Then, when the first major update was made, Microsoft gave it the name Win32 and gave the first version the name Win16. The term Windows API refers to both versions and all subsequently developed major versions.

- Win16 is in the 16-bit versions of Windows. The functions reside mainly in core files of the OS: kernel.exe (or krnl286.exe or krnl386.exe), user.exe and gdi.exe. Despite the file extension being EXE, such a file is accessed as a DLL.
- Win32 is in the 32-bit versions of Windows (NT, 95, and later). The functions are implemented in system DLL files including kernel32.dll, user32.dll, and gdi32.dll. Win32 was introduced with Windows NT. In Windows 95, it was initially referred to as Win32c, with c meaning compatibility or chicago. This term was later abandoned by Microsoft in favor of Win32.
- Win32s is an extension for the Windows 3.1x family of Microsoft Windows that implemented a subset of the Win32 API for these systems. The "s" stands for "subset".
- Win64 is the version in the 64-bit platforms of the Windows architecture (as of 2021, x86-64 and AArch64). (Note: Nomenclature of released 64-bit versions includes Windows XP Professional x64 Edition and x64 Editions of Windows Server 2003, Windows Vista and Windows Server 2008 on the x86-64 (AMD64) platform, and Windows 2000 Server Limited Edition, Windows XP 64-bit Edition, Windows Advanced Server 2003 for Itanium and Windows 2008 Advanced Server for Itanium on the IA-64 platform.) Both 32-bit and 64-bit versions of an application can be compiled from one codebase, although some older API functions have been deprecated, and some of the API functions that were deprecated in Win32 were removed. All memory pointers are 64-bit by default (the LLP64 model), so porting Win32-compatible source code includes updating for 64-bit pointer arithmetic.
- WinCE is the version in the Windows CE operating system.

== Other implementations ==
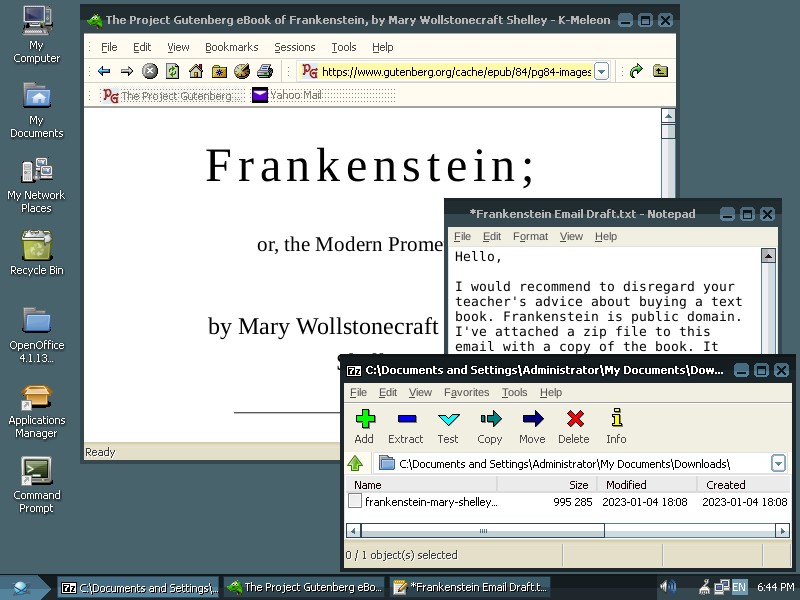
ReactOS is a free and open-source operating system that aims to implement the Windows API.

The Wine project provides a Win32 API compatibility layer for Unix-like platforms, between Linux kernel API and programs written for the Windows API. ReactOS goes a step further and aims to implement the full Windows operating system, working closely with the Wine project to promote code re-use and compatibility. DosWin32 and HX DOS Extender are other projects which emulate the Windows API to allow executing simple Windows programs from a DOS command line. Odin is a project to emulate Win32 on OS/2, superseding the original Win-OS/2 emulation which was based on Microsoft code. Other minor implementations include the MEWEL and Zinc libraries which were intended to implement a subset of the Win16 API on DOS (see List of platform-independent GUI libraries).

Windows Interface Source Environment (WISE) was a licensing program from Microsoft which allowed developers to recompile and run Windows-based applications on Unix and Macintosh platforms. WISE SDKs were based on an emulator of the Windows API that could run on those platforms.

Efforts toward standardization included Sun's Public Windows Interface (PWI) for Win16 (see also: Sun Windows Application Binary Interface (Wabi)), Willows Software's Application Programming Interface for Windows (APIW) for Win16 and Win32 (see also: Willows TWIN), and ECMA-234, which attempted to standardize the Windows API bindingly.

== Compiler support ==
To develop software that uses the Windows API, a compiler must be able to use the Microsoft-specific DLLs listed above (COM-objects are outside Win32 and assume a certain vtable layout). The compiler must either handle the header files that expose the interior API function names, or supply such files.

For the language C++, Zortech (later Symantec, then Digital Mars), Watcom and Borland have all produced well-known commercial compilers that have been used often with Win16, Win32s, and Win32. Some of them supplied memory extenders, allowing Win32 programs to run on Win16 with Microsoft's redistributable Win32s DLL. The Zortech compiler was probably one of the first stable and usable C++ compilers for Windows programming, before Microsoft had a C++ compiler.

For certain classes of applications, the compiler system should also be able to handle interface description language (IDL) files. Collectively, these prerequisites (compilers, tools, libraries, and headers) are known as the Microsoft Platform SDK. For a time, the Microsoft Visual Studio and Borland's integrated development system were the only integrated development environments (IDEs) that could provide this (although, the SDK is downloadable for free separately from the entire IDE suite, from Microsoft Windows SDK for Windows 7 and .NET Framework 4).

As of 2016, the MinGW and Cygwin projects also provide such an environment based on the GNU Compiler Collection (GCC), using a stand-alone header file set, to make linking against the Win32-specific DLLs simple. LCC-Win32 is a C compiler maintained by Jacob Navia, freeware for non-commercial use. Pelles C is a freeware C compiler maintained by Pelle Orinius. Free Pascal is a free software Object Pascal compiler that supports the Windows API. The MASM32 package is a mature project providing support for the Windows API under Microsoft Macro Assembler (MASM) by using custom made or converted headers and libraries from the Platform SDK. Flat assembler FASM allows building Windows programs without using an external linker, even when running on Linux.

Windows specific compiler support is also needed for Structured Exception Handling (SEH). This system serves two purposes: it provides a substrate on which language-specific exception handling can be implemented, and it is how the kernel notifies applications of exceptional conditions such as dereferencing an invalid pointer or stack overflow. The Microsoft/Borland C++ compilers had the ability to use this system as soon as it was introduced in Windows 95 and NT, however the actual implementation was undocumented and had to be reverse engineered for the Wine project and free compilers. SEH is based on pushing exception handler frames onto the stack, then adding them to a linked list stored in thread-local storage (the first field of the thread environment block). When an exception is thrown, the kernel and base libraries unwind the stack running handlers and filters as they are encountered. Eventually, every exception unhandled by the application will be dealt with by the default backstop handler, which pops up the Windows common crash dialog.

== Other languages ==
Microsoft has plans to update the Windows API for modern C++ usage with their win32metadata project. Currently, there is C++/WinRT and "Windows Implementation Library" (WIL) for doing this in modern C++. Microsoft has also created bindings for other languages, including C# and Rust for calling the Win32 API.

== See also ==
- Windows.h
- Windows Libraries for OS/2
- Interix – Unix subsystem for Windows NT operating systems
- Linux kernel API – Linux kernel APIs and ABIs
- Microsoft Windows library files – List of main shared-libraries of Microsoft Windows
- Windows legacy audio components – Obsolete Microsoft Windows audio APIs
- C++/WinRT – Windows Runtime library for C++
- Windows Native API
- C POSIX library
- C standard library
- C++ Standard Library
